= Palm Multi-Connector =

Power, audio and data interface connector designed by Palm, Inc.

- Close view of Palm Multi-Connector. Data cable connector features a hotsync button.
- Type: Communication, power supply, USB

Production history
- Designer: Palm, Inc.
- Superseded: Palm Universal Connector

General specifications
- Pins: 18

The Palm Multi-Connector (also Athena Connector) is a power, audio and data interface connector designed by Palm, Inc.

== Use ==
The connector is used by: LifeDrive, Tungsten E2, Tungsten T5, Treo 650, Treo 680, Treo 700p, Treo 750, Treo 755p, Palm TX, Palm Centro.

== Changes ==
Palm, Inc. has changed the connectors it uses over time:

- some early models used model-specific connectors or Palm Serial.
- some models connected via Palm Universal Connector (Older Standard for Palm Handhelds, circa 2001-2004)
- some machines used a standard Mini USB (Some Low-Budget Handhelds)
- some machines used a Multi-Connector (Newer standard for palmOne and Palm Handhelds)

The Connector can be used to charge the device, transfer data to a computer, HotSync, and play audio. It is the new standard to replace the previous Palm Universal Connector, which performed similar functions but did not have an audio output capability.

This port has also been used to connect to an external microphone or to GPS units

== Specification ==
The connector is divided in two sections: the longer one has thirteen pins numbered from right to left (5 to 17); the shorter one has three pins, on the left (3), top (2) and right (1). The cable shield connectors (4,18) are located on each side of the thirteen pins.

Pin # on device/Multiconnector	Pin # on charger/adapter connector	Pin# on data/cable connector	Name	Direction with respect to the device	Default state with no attachment	Function
1	1		VDOCK	Power	CHRG_IN	DC charging voltage, 5 V
2	2		ADAPTER_ID	Input	VCC, weak pull-up	Adapter identification
3	3		VDOCK_RTN	Power	GND	DC charging return
4		1	SHIELD	Shield	GND	Cable shield
5		2	VBUS	Power	VBUS_IN	USB charging voltage, 5 V typical, 500 mA max
6		3	USB_DP	Input/Output	Floating	USB Data +
7		4	USB_DN	Input/Output	Floating	USB Data -
8		5	DGND	Power	GND	Digital ground, and VBUS return
9		6	Reserved	NA	NA	Do not connect
10		7	TXD	Input/output	VCC, weak pull-up	Transmit data, 3.3 V logic level
11		8	RXD	Input	VCC, weak pull-up	Receive data, 3.3 V logic level
12		9	HOTSYNC	Input	VCC, weak pull-up	HotSync input, active low, pulled up on device
13		10	POWER_OUT	Output	High impedance	Power output to external devices
14		11	SPKR_L	Analog output	AC coupled	Speaker output left
15		12	SPKR_R	Analog output	AC coupled	Speaker output right
16		13	AGND	Power	GND	Analog ground
17		14	MIC_IN	Analog input	DC coupled	Microphone input
18		15	SHIELD	Shield	GND	Cable shield

Pins 10 and 11 have TTL levels and cannot be directly connected to the RS-232 port.

== Opinion ==
The Multi-Connector has received criticism from users who were familiar with previous connectors such as the Universal Connector. Users have been frustrated with the requirement to replace their Universal Connector cables, cradles, keyboards, sleds, and attachments as they have become incompatible. Another criticism is that the connector is fiddly, harder to remove and feels fragile.

All that is needed to charge the Treo is to connect +5 V to VDOCK and 0 V (negative) to VDOCK_RTN.
