= Blazer (web browser) =

Web browser

Blazer browser on a Palm Treo phone, 2007

Blazer was a web browser available for Palm handhelds running Palm OS 3.1 or higher.

The original version of Blazer was developed by Bluelark Systems and was released in November 2000. Bluelark Systems was acquired by Handspring a month later, in December 2000. Version 1.0 supported HTML, WAP, and the markup language used in i-Mode. Following the end of popular use of Palm OS, Blazer is no longer developed.

== Version history ==
=== Blazer 1 ===
Blazer 1 was released in November 2000, and differentiated itself from other Palm OS web browsers at the time by its fast performance, progressive rendering, and support of WAP and i-Mode in addition to HTML. It utilized a proxy server which provided transcoding and image conversion optimized for small, underpowered handheld devices. Blazer 1 was available for free download.

=== Blazer 2 ===
Blazer 2 was released in early 2002. Blazer 2 added the ability to use proxy servers, SSL, 16 bit color, and an improved user interface. Blazer 2 was available both as product bundled with the Treo 180, and as a paid download.

As of September 22, 2005, all copies of Blazer 1 and 2 were rendered inoperable as the proxy server for these browsers was taken offline by Palm.

=== Blazer 3 ===
Blazer 3 was a significant upgrade in the series. Palm, Inc. dumped the original code for Blazer and started fresh with the NetFront Browser Engine (most notably used in the Sony Clie) as the core of the Blazer browser. It is bundled with Treo 600.

=== Blazer 4 ===
Next came Palm Blazer 4.0/4.1. It was bundled with the Tungsten E2, the Tungsten T5, and the Treo 650 and 680. New features included faster loading, an improved UI, VPN with an extra plugin, the saving of image and HTML files to a memory card or the device, homepages, bookmarks, and the ability to start on the last viewed page. Blazer 4 also featured support for web standards including HTML 4.01, XHTML 1.0, WML 1.3, SSL 3.0, cHTML, JavaScript 1.5, CSS 1.0 and 2.0 (partial), GIF (both still and animated, along with transparency), JPEG, PNG, BMP and Cookies. The use of some advanced features may cause the browser to crash if it is not in Wide Page Mode.

Soon after, Blazer 4.3 browser became available on the Treo 650, TX and LifeDrive. The most significant addition to 4.3 was the fast mode option, which removes images and/or disables cascading style sheets.

Blazer 4.5 was released in May 2006, along with the Treo 700p as part of the device's application suite. It offers faster page rendering, and support for streaming video (using a built-in version of Kinoma Player). It was also provided with the Treo 755p along with a mobile optimized version of Google Maps.

== Streaming video ==
Video is streamed via the Kinoma Video Player. It supports many formats, including Windows Media.

At this time, Blazer does not support Adobe Flash Player - meaning you cannot view popular videos on sites such as ESPN or YouTube. This issue has never been addressed by Palm. A relatively small number of phones have the ability to use Flash.

The new Centro has demonstrated the ability to play YouTube videos on its browser using a high speed internet connection. This is demonstrated on the mobile version of YouTube which does not use Flash Technology. Previous Palm phones with the current version of Blazer can also play these videos. This is the same version of YouTube accessed by the application of the same name on the Apple iPhone.

Kinoma released an upgrade to the Video Player, which can be purchased for many Palm phones, that has support for Flash Video, but is not part of the Blazer web browser itself. The videos must be searched for via the Kinoma media guide. This guide acts as a browser for many popular video sites, like YouTube and Google Video. Many Palm users could get a discount on this upgrade.
