= Palm handheld modifications =

Several Palm (PDA) enthusiasts have successfully documented internal and external handheld battery modifications to allow longer charge times for their handheld device. Rapidly advancing battery technology allows smaller and longer-lasting batteries to be placed into the space of the original batteries. Modifications of this type can be technically challenging and will almost certainly void any manufacturer warranty and have the potential to damage the modified device permanently.

== Popular modifications ==
Many PDAs are not suitable for modification or do not require it; the newest devices include advanced high-capacity batteries, whilst some devices cannot be dismantled without permanent damage.

The Palm Tungsten T3 came with a built-in 900 mAh rechargeable Lithium ion battery. The T1 and T2 also used a 900 mAh battery, but because of the upgraded Palm Tungsten T3 processor the battery life is significantly reduced. The modest battery life is the largest criticism of the Tungsten T3 compared to other Palm models. One of the most popular handhelds of all time, the Palm Tungsten T3 is a typical candidate for battery modification.

The Tungsten T5 however, included a much newer battery and is therefore a much less likely candidate for replacement, at least not yet. Much fuss has been made over the issue of the iPod's built-in li-ion battery and the fact that it is not designed to be replaceable. Some have similar concerns over their handhelds' batteries and decide to try and remedy the problem themselves, just as was done on the iPod before Apple started offering extended warranties: in fact, Apple iPod replacement batteries have become somewhat of a favourite for use as external replacements/additions.

=== Replacing the internal battery ===
A popular method discussed extensively on the brighthand.com and spug.net for modification have involved opening the case and removing the original 900 mAh battery and replacing it with various higher-capacity batteries, or simply replacing it because of age (a replacement battery costs a small fraction of the manufacturer's battery-replacement charge).

Several people have successfully documented replacing the built-in Lithium ion battery with a higher-capacity battery, increasing time the T3 can be used without charging.. Batteries of 1100 mAh are available that fit just fine. However, disassembling the case is complicated by 5 small metal tabs, not mentioned by most online instruction pages: two on each side, and one on the back just above the docking connector, which must be released as one of the first disassembly steps (for example, by inserting a very thin shim and pushing it gently down, while pulling the bottom panel down enough to clear it).

The biggest problem when upgrading the T3 battery to even higher capacity, however, is that there is limited space within the handheld shell for a larger battery. Hence, modification typically requires some crushing of the replacement battery to make it fit and/or irreversible modification to the internal components of the shell (for example the stylus holder). Another problem is that lithium-ion batteries require a regulator circuit to regulate battery charge preventing damage, and so replacement batteries either require a built-in one or a grafted regulator circuit added.

=== The battery replacement process ===
Many guides have been written on the battery replacement process, including many users of popular PDA forums such as brighthand.com and spug.net. Many companies that supply PDA parts also provide their own guides for battery replacement; these are usually less radical and require little or no actual modification. Most guides include a clear disclaimer explaining the dangers involved and the definite loss of warranty from the vendor/manufacturer. Specific examples of step-by-step guides can be found below in the links section.

=== External power modifications ===
PalmOne released a Power2Go modification which allows the palm device to receive charge from an external battery pack. Many cheap alternatives are available from online electronics stores and auctions such as eBay. These devices usually supply power from four AA size batteries, allowing for more flexibility in storage capacity as exhausted batteries can be replaced as required.

Homemade devices with higher mAh power supplies have been made by some enthusiasts to increase the external charge. These can either plug directly into the Palm Universal Connector (on older handhelds), the Palm Multi-Connector or hard-wired directly into the device's power terminals on the motherboard.

== Clock speed reduction ==
As the T3 uses a 400 MHz processor, using the same 900 mAh battery from the T1 and T2 just doesn't cut it. The best way to extend the battery life of a T3 easily, is to use underclocking software like PXA clocker, Lightspeed or Warpspeed. This can give about 5-6 hours of runtime. However users who uses Bluetooth and Wi-Fi extensively will find that even with underclocking, battery life is still rather short as wireless usage tends to use more power.

== See also ==
- Palm Tungsten Handheld devices
