= Palm Tungsten =

Personal digital assistant

Tungsten E
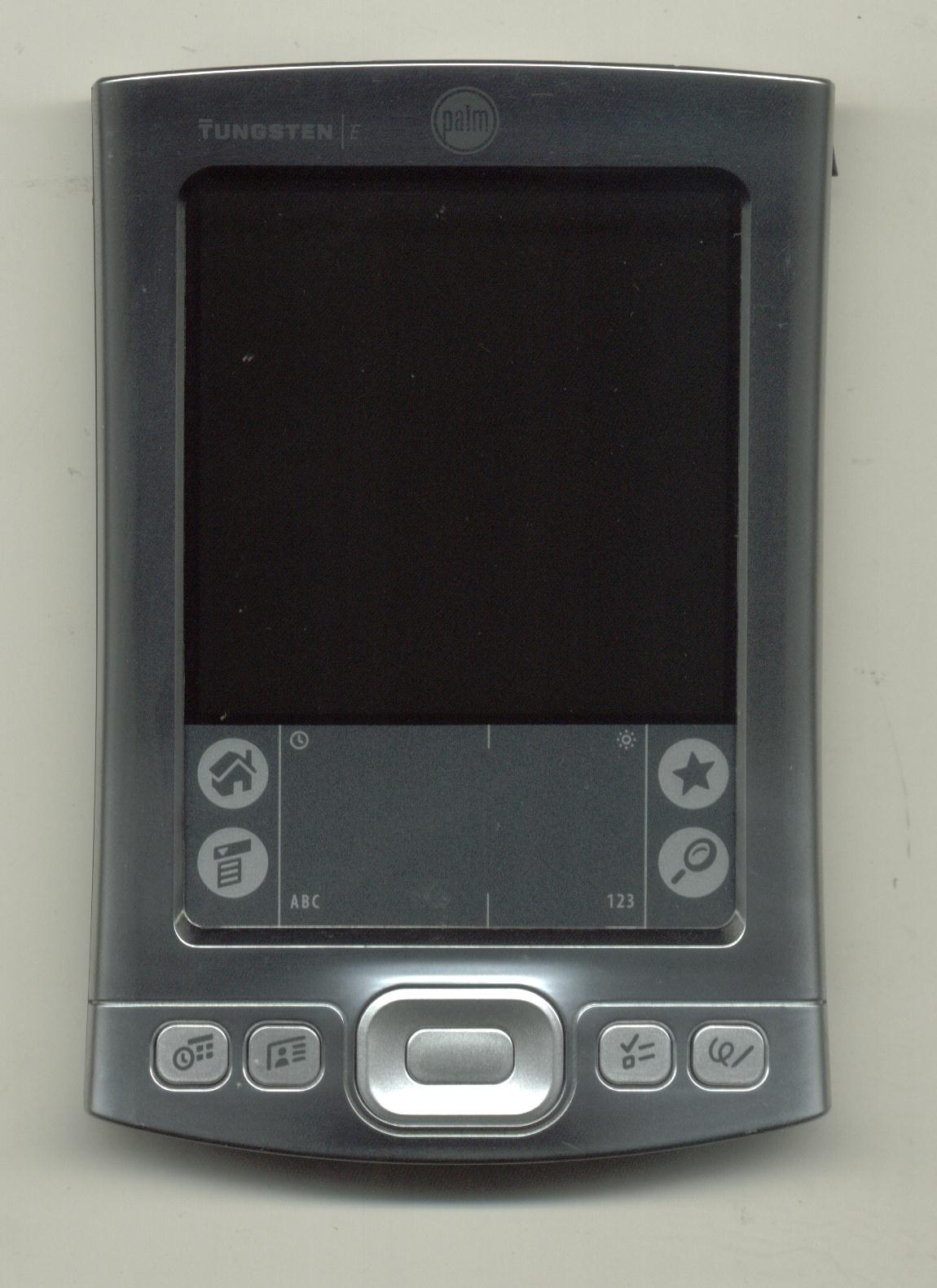
- Manufacturer: Palm, Inc.
- Type: Personal digital assistant
- Lifespan: October, 2003–April, 2005
- Media: Secure Digital card
- Operating system: Palm OS 5.2.1
- Display: 320 x 320 16-bit, 320 x 480 in later models TFT LCD
- Input: Touchscreen
- Connectivity: Universal Serial Bus, IrDA
- Power: lithium ion battery

The Tungsten series was Palm, Inc.'s line of business-class Palm OS-based PDAs.

== Details ==
The Tungsten series was introduced in October 2002, created as a "prosumer" line priced at $199 to $300 to compete with the popular Sony Clie and Windows Mobile PDAs. The first device in the line is the Tungsten T, making it the first Palm PDA to be labeled with a letter rather than a number and to run Palm OS 5.

All of the Tungsten PDAs have a few attributes in common:

- 65,536 color LCD touch screen with a minimum 320 x 320 pixel resolution
- metal or metal-toned enclosure
- available flip cover to protect the screen
- Secure Digital (SD) card slot with SDIO for memory cards and accessories
- no built-in camera

All models except the Tungsten C, W, and E have built-in Bluetooth wireless capabilities, while the Tungsten C and TX feature built-in Wi-Fi connectivity. Furthermore, by using the optional Palm Wi-Fi SDIO cards Card accessory, the T3, T5, and E2 can also gain Wi-Fi connectivity.

With the exception of the Tungsten W, all Tungsten PDAs run Palm OS 5 "Garnet" on an ARM processor and have non-user-replaceable lithium-ion batteries. Some users replaced battery packs with third-party units. The T3, for example, shipped with a 900 mAh capacity battery but third-party 1100 mAh or 1150 mAh LI-poly batteries of the same physical dimensions were available. Tungsten models used a five-way navigator pad, in the shape of a rounded rectangle, circle, or oval and had four buttons for built-in applications.

The Palm Universal Connector is used by the Tungsten T, Tungsten T2, Tungsten T3, Tungsten C, Tungsten W, for cradles and accessories, while the Tungsten E uses a mini-USB connection; the Tungsten T5, Tungsten E2 and TX used an Athena Connector also known as the Palm Multi-Connector.

All Tungsten handhelds come bundled with Dataviz's Documents To Go office suite and some version of Kinoma Player, with the exception of the Tungsten W.

== Models ==
=== Tungsten E ===
The Tungsten E was introduced as an entry-level handheld in Palm's Tungsten series. It had 32 megabytes of memory, a 126 MHz Texas Instruments OMAP (ARM) processor, a 2.125 in × 2.125 in (54.0 mm × 54.0 mm) transflective TFT screen, and ran Palm OS 5.2.1. The device measured 4.5 in × 3.1 in × 0.5 in (114 mm × 79 mm × 13 mm) and weighed 4.6 oz (130 g).

It had a standard 3.5 mm headphone jack and a speaker in back and used a mini USB connector not supported by most dock accessories. At introduction, it was US$199.

The Tungsten E, released in October 2003, was intended to replace the aging Palm m515, one of the last holdouts from Palm's old product line. The Tungsten E, though, did not include a vibrating alarm and indicator light like the Palm m500 series had.

Since it was released at the same time as the Tungsten T3, the Tungsten E included the T3's newer PIM apps and the enhanced "agenda view" for quick viewing of to-do items and upcoming calendar items. The Tungsten E's design influenced the Tungsten T series' subsequent devices, the Tungsten T5 and the TX.

It was superseded in April 2005, when palmOne released the Tungsten E2.

=== Tungsten E2 ===
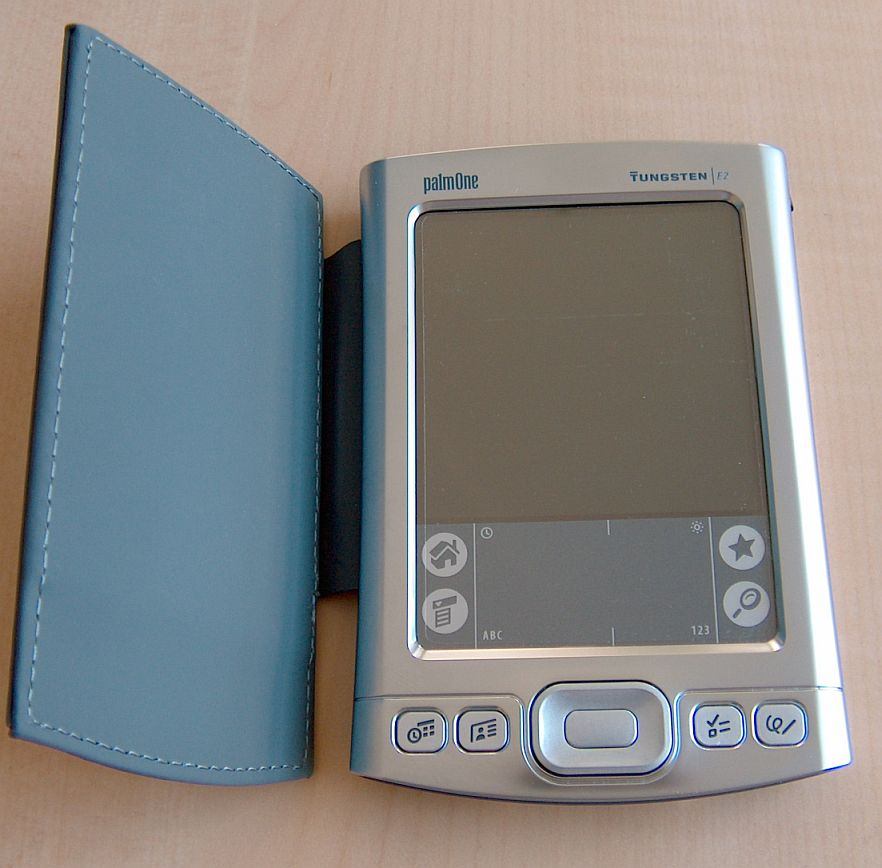
Tungsten E2

The Tungsten E2, introduced on April 13, 2005, replaced the similarly named Tungsten E, had 32 MB of memory (29.7 available), a 200 MHz Intel XScale processor, 320x320 Transflective TFT color display, and ran Palm OS Garnet v5.4.7. It is 114 by 79 by 15 millimeters (4.5 by 3.1 by 0.59 in) and weighs 133 grams (4.7 oz). It had a standard 3.5 mm headphone jack, a longer-lasting battery than the Tungsten E, had Bluetooth capability, and a single speaker on the back.

Much like the Tungsten T5 and Treo 650, it used non-volatile flash memory, this time in the form of Non-Volatile File System, meaning that the data would be preserved even if the battery ran out. It used standard SD memory cards and was also compatible with the Palm Wi-Fi Card (sold separately). It used a standard Athena Connector port supported only by some then-newer accessories.

When it was released, its retail price was US$249. In October 2005, the price was reduced to US$199.

Unlike other models, the Find function was limited to only the first eight matches, and the calculator incorrectly found percentages at half their actual value, though this was fixed in units shipping after April 2006.

The Tungsten E2 had the ability to use WiFi, but only by using an add-on SDIO card released by PalmOne, manufactured by SyChip. Encryption was restricted to primitive WEP security, and did not offer WPA or WPA2.

The maximum size SD card supported on the Tungsten E2 was 1 GB due to a software limitation. In order to read larger SD and SDHC cards an upgraded driver is required. The previous model (Tungsten E) had been reported to be capable of using 2 GB SD cards.

=== Tungsten T ===
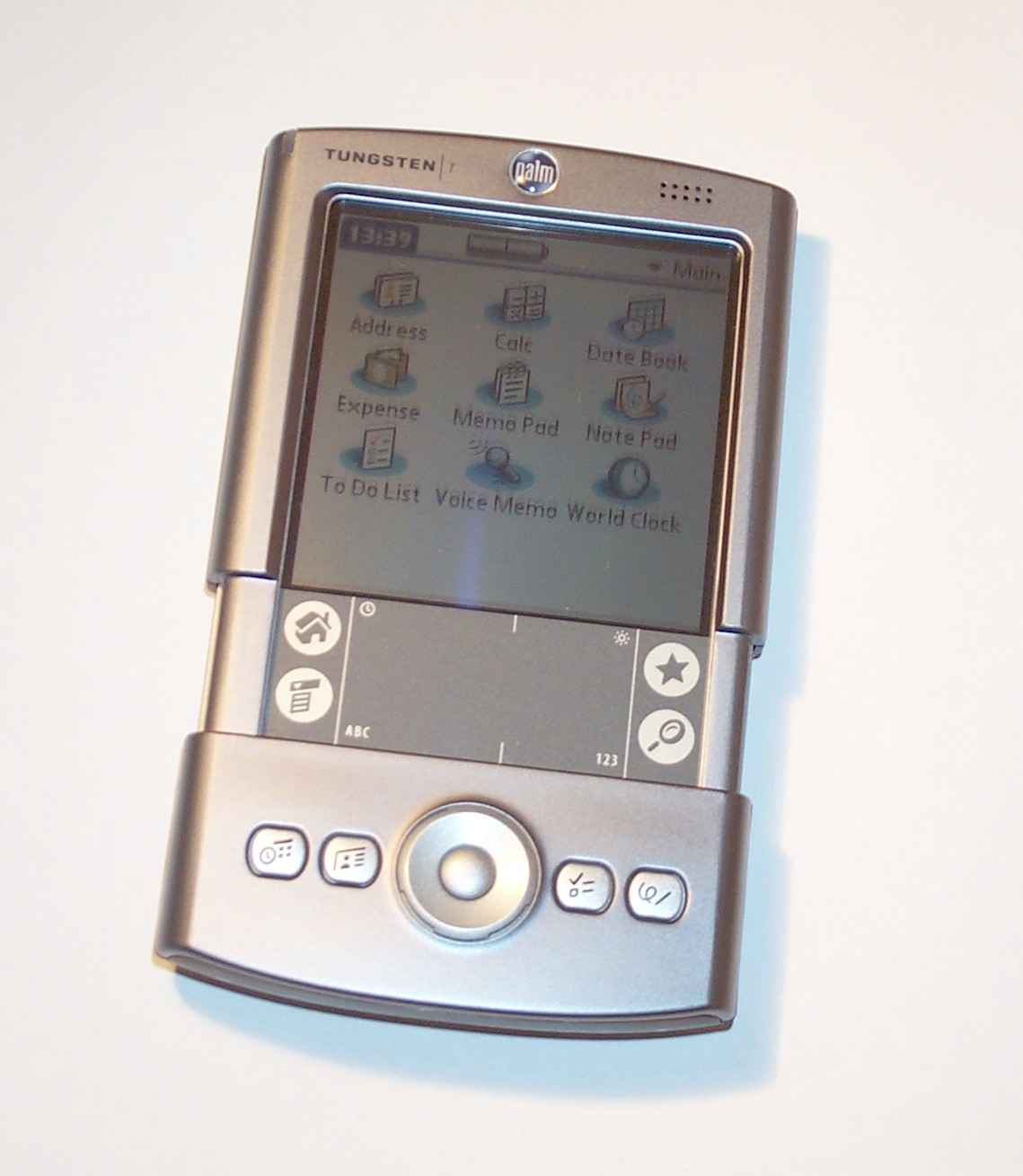
Tungsten T (with sliding section extended)

The first Tungsten, the Tungsten T, introduced in November 2002 and known during development as the M550, was the first model to use Palm OS 5. The Tungsten T was designed by Palm engineers based in Arlington Heights, Illinois.

It had:

- 16 megabytes of memory,
- Texas Instruments OMAP (ARM) 144 MHz processor,
- built-in microphone for voice memos,
- dedicated voice memo button,
- vibrating alarms,
- standard 3.5 mm headphone jack,
- one front-facing speaker,
- indicator light,
- Palm OS 5.0

It is 4.0 inches (100 mm) tall, 4.8 inches (120 mm) tall with the slider extended, by 3.0 inches (76 mm) wide by 0.6 inches (15 mm) thick, and weighs 5.6 ounces (160 g).

Its design set itself apart from other PDAs by having a sliding lower portion; the bottom third of the casing could be slid up and down to cover or reveal the touch-sensitive Graffiti writing area. At introduction, it was US$499.

Many of the features in the Tungsten T were Palm firsts. It was the first Palm PDA to use a version of Palm OS 5 and an ARM processor, which meant that it had the software and processing power for high-quality real-time video playback and MP3 playback.

It was also the first Palm PDA with a:

- 320 × 320 resolution screen
- Bluetooth wireless communications radio built-in
- microphone with a dedicated voice memo button
- front-facing speaker instead of rear-facing
- telescoping stylus
- reset hole large enough to be pressed by the included stylus' tip instead of a pin as with previous Palm PDAs

The slider feature was unique. When open, the Tungsten T looked like a normal slate-shaped PDA, but the bottom portion, with the five-way controller and four buttons, could slide shut, covering up the Graffiti writing area. This made it the smallest Palm PDA in height. The Tungsten T was the last Palm PDA to use the original Graffiti Version 1 handwriting recognition software. Because of a lawsuit by Xerox Corporation Palm Inc. was forced to discontinue Graffiti 1 and later Palm PDAs used Graffiti Version 2. The revised software required two separate strokes for entry of some letters of the alphabet, such as the letters "t" and "k". Most all of the other letters required strokes different from those used in Graffiti 1.

Palm's reasoning behind the slider was that users spent more time viewing data rather than entering it. Thus, they chose to hide the data entry medium while not in use to make a more compact device.

The slider caused two problems with the Tungsten T. One drawback was that the Tungsten T was known for its digitizer becoming miscalibrated after about one year of use and requiring further recalibration. A software patch issued by Palm helped with this problem. Another problem was that the ribbon cable between the mainboard and the digitizer connectors that tended to become loose over time, requiring disassembly to reconnect the ribbon cable for further use.

The Tungsten T was succeeded by the Tungsten T2.

=== Tungsten T2 ===
The Tungsten T2, introduced in July 2003 for US$399, was simply a minor update to the Tungsten T, and had exactly the same form factor. (Save for the label and the T|T2's slightly lighter case color, they are superficially identical.) The memory was increased to 32 megabytes, the screen was replaced with a superior (backlight) TFT LCD of the same size and resolution, Palm OS upgraded to 5.2.1, Graffiti replaced with Graffiti2. Since it is much like the Tungsten T model, PalmOne did not sell this model in some markets, such as mainland China or Brazil.

The Tungsten T2 was discontinued in April 2004, having been succeeded by the Tungsten T3.

=== Tungsten T3 ===
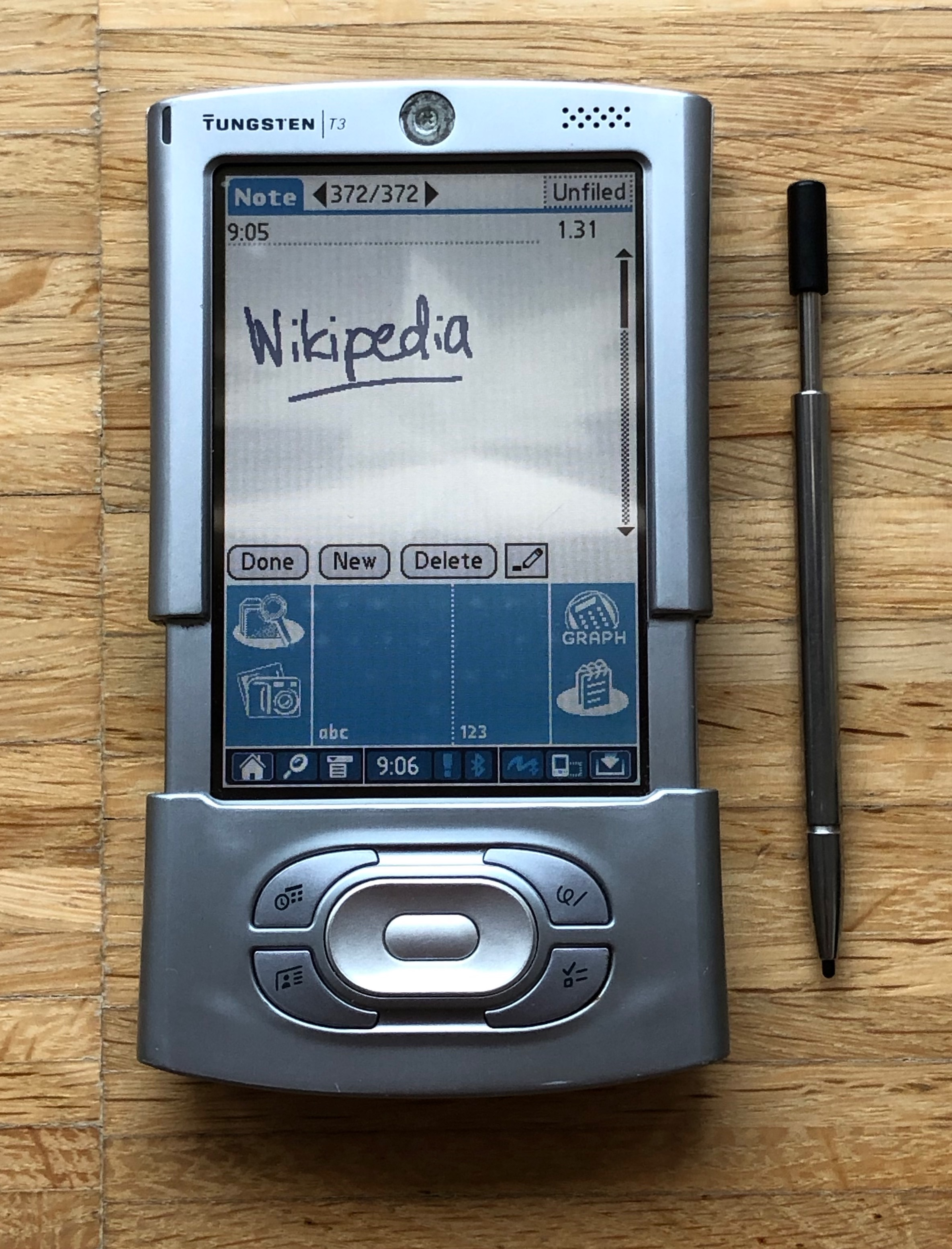
Tungsten T3

The Tungsten T3 was the third T-Class Tungsten device, released in October 2003. It had 64 MB of memory (with 52 MB usable), a 400 MHz Intel PXA261 processor, a new 3.7-inch 320×480 transflective TFT LCD touch-screen, and ran Palm OS version 5.2.1. It was the last product designed by the Palm engineers in Arlington Heights.

The T3 included Active Input Technology with Virtual Graffiti 2, a virtual keyboard, and the typical Tungsten line slider. Along with many other additional features, the T3 was released with the same $399 retail price tag as the Tungsten T2 until the release of the Tungsten T5, when it was reduced to $349.

Like the Tungsten T and T2, the T3 still had a front-facing speaker, a microphone, a vibrating alarm feature, an indicator light, and all of their other features.

Like the Tungsten E, the Tungsten T3 came with an enhanced PIM Suite which categorized all appointments and tasks on the Calendar (formerly Date Book) screen. The Enhanced PIM Software also featured an improved Task suite (formerly To Do List) which could categorize tasks by urgency, category, etc., and an improved Contacts (formerly Address) application with picture support and more fields.

Furthermore, a new status bar appeared at the bottom of screen, giving quick access to the time, system information, home, find, menu access, alerts, Bluetooth, full-screen writing, screen rotation, and what is shown in the input area.

The Tungsten T3 came with RealPlayer for Palm OS Handhelds (called RealOne Player for Palm OS Handhelds at the time of its release) in addition to a 3.5 mm Stereo Jack, making it a digital music player when used with a Secure Digital (SD) flash memory card.

The T3 had a bigger, non-round, 5-way navigation pad with the four application buttons placed around it in a circular fashion instead of in a row, breaking from Palm's traditional application button layout. Palm would return to its more traditional layout in the following Tungsten T5 and Palm TX.

The T3 had a Green/Red LED indicator light, however Palm only used the green LED for most purposes, red only being used by certain third-party programs and libraries.

The T3 also had the Palm Universal Connector and an included USB cradle. The cradle was used for both charging and synchronizing the Palm's data to a PC (With support included for Windows and Mac OS X, but with the pilot-link software, the unit synchronizes perfectly with a Unix operating system).

Early criticisms of the Tungsten T3 include it electronically damaging SD cards and its relatively low battery life (900 mA·h battery, larger display and processor clocked above most other Palm handhelds). Palm addressed the Secure Digital Card problem by releasing a Firmware Update. After the "SD Card Patch" was applied in early (by the user via a firmware patch) and later (at the manufacturing stage) releases of the Tungsten T3, no other criticisms were known to have risen from the Tungsten T3's use.

Shortly after the early 2005 release of the Tungsten T5, the Tungsten T3 was discontinued. Since then, no other Palm handhelds included a vibrating alarm, a slider to make the device smaller, or the Palm Universal Connector.

=== Tungsten T5 ===
The Tungsten T5, introduced in October 2004 and now discontinued, was aesthetically a combination of the Tungsten E and Tungsten T3. It was the first and only Tungsten to use a 416 MHz Intel XScale PXA270 processor. It had a 320×480 TFT 16-bit color screen with a virtual input area. It retained the shape of the Tungsten E, but was taller, instead of the sliding bodies of the previous Tungsten T-series handhelds.

The Tungsten T5 was the first Palm PDA to have a 320×480 pixel screen without a slider mechanism as used in the Tungsten T3, T2, and T, though other brands have had sliderless HVGA displays for years. It was also the first to have 256 MB of memory (versus 64 MB in the Tungsten T3), with 161.2 MB configured as a Flash Drive - accessible to computers via the device's Drive Mode feature, 63.8 MB available for applications, and 31 MB reserved for the OS. This often resulted in some confusion as the memory was not equally usable as in previous Palm PDAs.

While the Tungsten T5 was meant to be a replacement for the Tungsten T3, it lacked several features from the Tungsten T3 such as a charge-indicator LED, a vibrating alarm, an included HotSync cradle, and built in microphone for voice memos. Furthermore, its speaker became rear-facing instead of front-facing and the PDA used the then-new Multi-Connector/Athena Connector instead of the Palm Universal Connector. The speed of the Bluetooth connection can only be set to a maximum of 128 kbit/s.

At the time of its release, the Tungsten T5 (along with the Treo 650) was plagued with memory inefficiency problems, third-party application issues, and device driver crashes, due to the new Non-Volatile File System. The addition of NVFS however, brought the benefit of no longer losing all stored data in the event of a complete battery drain.

Tungsten T5 owners were encouraged to install the Tungsten T5 1.1 Update, which addressed the memory inefficiency issues alongside other operating system-level problems.

The power button was prone to reliability issues causing it to become inoperative over time, requiring the user to either use a third-party app, rely on the PDA's other physical buttons or insert a SD card which would then switch the PDA back on.

In some countries, including Australia, the Tungsten T5 was withdrawn early since the Palm TX offered more advanced, built-in WiFi support, instead of requiring the optional Palm Wi-Fi Card in its one and only SD slot as many other non-Palm PDAs on the market at the time came standard with built-in WiFi.

=== Tungsten W ===
The Tungsten W (known as the i710 during its development period, and X420 at the prototype stage), was introduced in February 2003. The sole smartphone (PDA/cellphone hybrid) in the Tungsten series, instead of running Palm OS 5 on an ARM-compatible processor, it used last-generation Palm OS 4 paired with a Motorola DragonBall processor that was typical of Palm OS 4 devices.

It had a thumb-sized hard plastic keyboard, like the Treo 600 rather than the typical silkscreen Graffiti Writing Area found on most Palm handhelds. (This form factor would be reused in the Tungsten C, except lacking the W's external antennae).

The Tungsten W focused more on its PDA half than its cellular telephony half, much like its predecessors, the Palm i705 and Palm VII. Unlike either the Palm i705 and the Palm VII (which both could only make data connections over the Mobitex pager network), downloads and uploads were done using comparatively-fast GPRS connections. It lacked a microphone and the speaker couldn't be used for phone calls; instead, an included ear bud and microphone loopset was used for voice calls.

A flip cover was also released that allowed the user to hold the handheld like a normal phone and talk on it, although it did obscure the screen. (In the US, it was sold exclusively by AT&T Wireless, and all Tungsten W handsets sold in the US were locked to AT&T Wireless. Canadian W's were not locked to any service provider and could operate with T-Mobile SIM cards).

It had 16 megabytes of memory, a Motorola DragonBall 33 MHz processor, vibrating alarms, indicator light, and ran Palm OS 4.1.1 (with an optional upgrade to 4.1.2) with special enhancements for its 320×320 display since most Palm OS 4 devices had 160×160 displays. It is 4.8 inches (120 mm) tall by 3.1 inches (79 mm) wide by 0.7 inches (18 mm) thick, and weighs 6.4 ounces (180 g). It had a standard 2.5 mm headset jack, and a single rear speaker. At introduction, it retailed at US$419 before service provider subsidies.

The Tungsten W was succeeded by the Treo 600 after Palm purchased Handspring and became palmOne.

=== Tungsten C ===
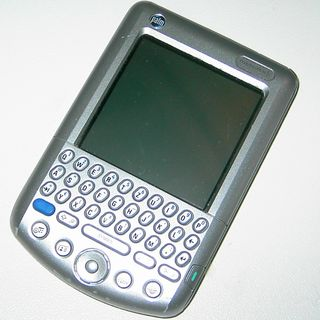
Tungsten C

The Tungsten C introduced in April 2003 was, at the time of its release, palmOne's only handheld that allowed the user to access the internet wirelessly through 802.11b Wi-Fi without the use of a card or other external device. It lacked support for the WPA encryption standard but did however have built in PPTP VPN support for secure connections to VPN servers.

The web browser included was PalmSource's Web Browser 2.0. Novarra Web Pro 3.0 could be purchased as an upgrade.

Other details were its 400 MHz Intel PXA255 processor, 64 MB of memory (51 MB available for programs + 12 MB heap), built-in thumb keyboard, a five-way navigator, a Secure Digital/SDIO/MultiMediaCard slot, vibrating alarms, indicator light, and a 2.5 mm headset jack, capable of voice recording and monaural sound output with a proprietary earbud headset (sold separately).

Third-party applications and hardware were available that worked around the Tungsten C's monaural audio. For instance, a special adapter could be purchased to convert to a standard 3.5 mm jack that splits the mono output into left and right channels.

The Tungsten C was superseded by the LifeDrive Mobile Manager, the Palm TX, and the Treo series.

== Comparison ==
Comparison of Tungsten devices
Name	T	W	C	T2	E	T3	T5	E2	TX
Release date	November 2002	February 2003	April 2003	July 2003	October 2003		October 2004	April 13, 2005	October 2005
Original retail price	US$499	US$419	US$499	US$399	US$199	US$399	US$399	US$249	US$299
Weight	5.6 oz (160 g)	6.4 oz (180 g)	6.31 oz (179 g)	5.6 oz (160 g)	4.62 oz (131 g)	5.4 oz (150 g)	5.1 oz (140 g)	4.7 oz (130 g)	5.2 oz (150 g)
Storage size: total/Non-volatile	16 MB/No	16 MB/No	64 MB/No	32 MB/No		64 MB/No	256 MB/Yes	32 MB/Yes	128 MB/Yes
Dynamic heap size	823 kB		12.6 MB			11.5 MB	4.2 MB	6.3 MB	
Display	Transflective TFT (active matrix)	Reflective TFT (active matrix)	Transflective TFT screen						
Resolution	320*320					320*480		320*320	320*480
Processor	Texas Instruments OMAP1510	Motorola Dragonball	Intel XScale PXA255	Texas Instruments OMAP1510	Texas Instruments OMAP311	Intel XScale PXA261	Intel XScale PXA270	Intel XScale PXA255	Intel XScale PXA270
Processor frequency	144 MHz	33 MHz	400 MHz	144 MHz	126 MHz	400 MHz	416 MHz	200 MHz	312 MHz
Palm OS version	5.0	4.1.1 (4.1.2 is available)	5.2.1				5.4.5 (upgradable to 5.4.8)	5.4.7	5.4.9
Audio output	3.5 mm Headphone Jack, Speaker (Front)	Jack for proprietary Headset/Mic	2.5 mm Headphone Jack for proprietary Headset	3.5 mm Headphone Jack, Speaker (Front)	3.5 mm Headphone Jack, Speaker (Back)	3.5 mm Headphone Jack, Speaker (Front)	3.5 mm Headphone Jack, Speaker (Back)		
Multimedia capabilities	Music Playback (with third party application (PTunes) and SD card) Patch available to improve sound quality	?				Music Playback (w/RealPlayer + SD card)	?		
Wireless Connectivity	Bluetooth, Infrared (IrDA)	GPRS, Infrared (IrDA)	802.11b WiFi, Infrared (IrDA)	Bluetooth, Infrared (IrDA)	Infrared (IrDA)	Bluetooth, Infrared (IrDA)			802.11b WiFi, Bluetooth, Infrared (IrDA)
PC Connection	Universal Connector				Mini-USB Port	Universal Connector	Athena Connector		
Additional features		Keyboard, Cellular	Keyboard			WiFi via SDIO card, Voice memo recording	WiFi via SDIO card		

== See also ==
- Palm, Inc.
- Palm Pilot
- Palm TX, the first business-oriented Palm-branded handheld without the Tungsten moniker.
- Zire Series, Palm's brand of consumer-grade handhelds
- Treo Series, Palm's brand of Smartphones
- LifeDrive, Palm's brand of Professional-Class Mobile Managers
- m500 Series
- Palm Handheld Modifications to increase battery life

=== Competitors and contemporaries ===
- Dell Axim
- iPAQ
- Sony CLIÉ
- Tapwave Zodiac
- iPod Touch
