= Treo 700 =

Treo 700 may refer to the Palm smartphone:

- Treo 700p
- Treo 700w
- Treo 700wx
