= LifeDrive =

Palm OS personal digital assistant

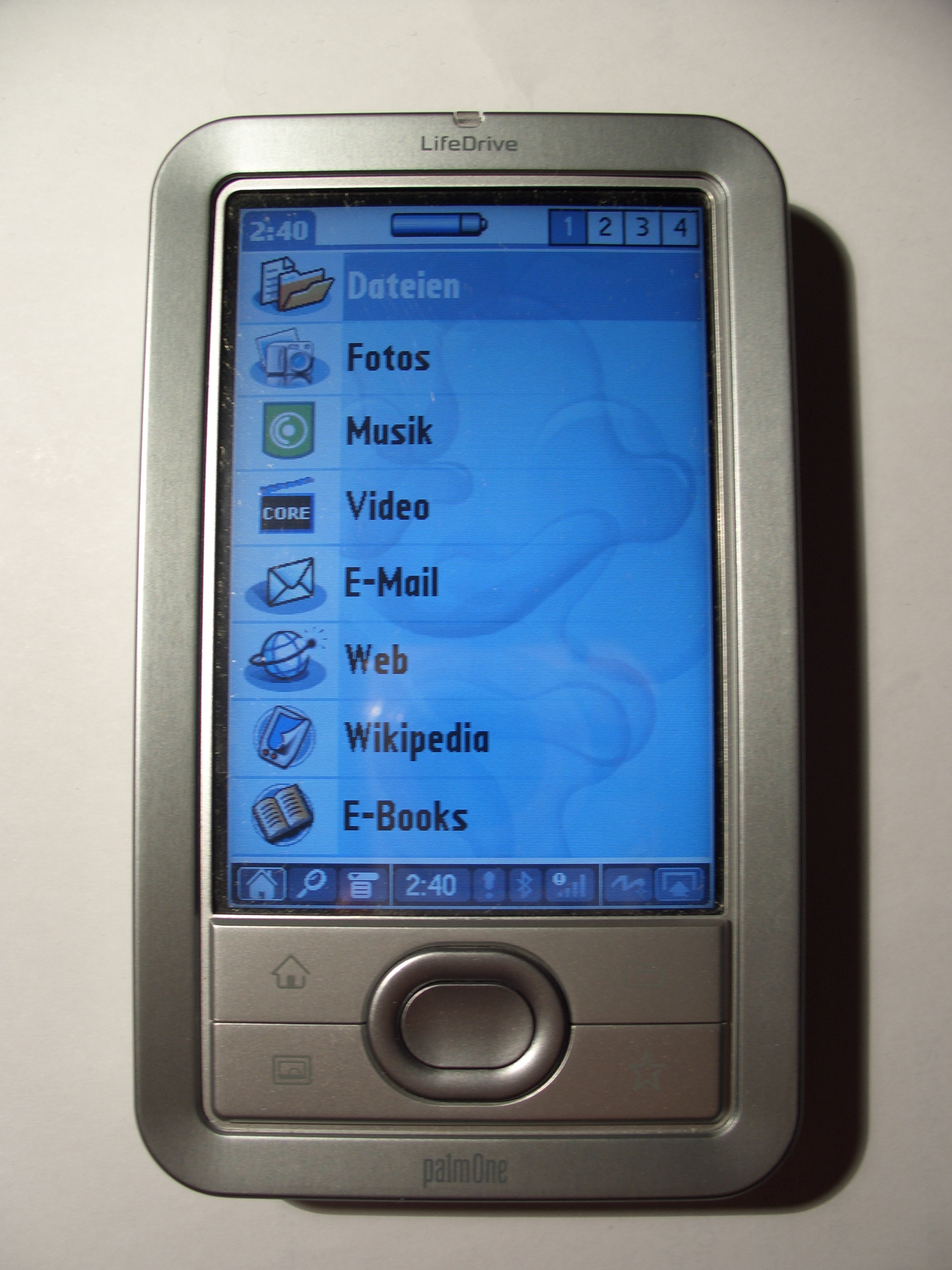
- The LifeDrive Mobile Manager
- Manufacturer: Palm Inc.
- Type: Candybar PDA
- Released: 2005
- Operating system: Palm OS Garnet 5.4.8
- CPU: Intel PXA270 at 416 MHz with Intel XScale Technology
- Storage: 4 GB Hitachi Microdrive (3.85 GB user-accessible); 64 MB Non-Volatile RAM (55 MB user-accessible); Secure Digital card slot
- Display: 320×480 px, 3.9 in (99 mm), 16-bit color TFT LCD touchscreen
- Sound: 3.5 mm stereo headphone jack, speaker, microphone
- Input: Graffiti 2 using stylus, Multi-Connector
- Camera: None
- Connectivity: Wi-Fi (802.11b), Bluetooth 1.1, IrDA
- Power: 1660 mA·h 3.7 V rechargeable lithium ion Non-Removable Battery
- Dimensions: Original: 4.76 in (121 mm) (h); 2.87 in (73 mm) (w); 0.74 in (19 mm) (d); 3G: 4.5 in (115.5 mm) (h); 2.4 in (62.1 mm) (w); 0.48 in (12.3 mm) (d)
- Weight: 190 g (6.7 oz)

The LifeDrive is a Palm OS-based handheld personal digital assistant device that was produced by PalmOne, a former incarnation of Palm, Inc. The device was PalmOne's first and only foray into the "Mobile Manager" device category. As its name suggests, Palm intended the LifeDrive to be capable of providing all the capabilities and data storage space that a user could possibly need during the course of the day, including contacts, calendar, music, images, video, and applications. At the time of release, the 4-gigabyte capacity that was chosen for this task could not be achieved using the flash memory used by most PDAs, while keeping the cost of the device low enough for consumer purchase. For this reason, a 4 GB microdrive hard disk drive was selected for the task. It featured a separate data partition that could be used as a portable disk drive. The LifeDrive featured Bluetooth and Wi-Fi connectivity, the first Palm handheld to feature both. The device came pre-loaded with eReader, Documents To Go, and WiFile software.

The hard disk used in the LifeDrive was selected by Palm for its fast spinup speed, but delays in application launching were inevitably longer than with flash-based handhelds. Many speed concerns were addressed with a user-applicable ROM update, which was released by Palm in December 2005. One of the first troubles for the Life Drive was when it was taken off of United Kingdom shelves because the device fell short of EU regulations on the use of hazardous materials. Finally, due to its high price, slower performance than other handhelds, and advances in flash memory which led to reduced prices and greater capacities, the LifeDrive did not fare well in the market, and was discontinued on January 31, 2007.

== Features ==
Besides being the first Palm device with a hard drive, the LifeDrive introduced other features that were new to Palm devices, such as a three-position power switch (on, off, keylock), and a dedicated screen rotation button. The new power switch became a feature of the Treo smartphone line; the screen rotation button also appeared on the TX, but was later phased out among Palm devices, with dedicated accelerometers taking over the task of properly orienting the screen.

== User upgrades ==
The ROM update for the LifeDrive is available at palm.com.

It is possible to replace the stock 4 GB Microdrive with a 4GB Compact Flash card, improving battery life and operating speed due to the lower power consumption of flash memory and relative speed increased compared to hard disks.

== Specifications ==
Indicator Light	Notification for various functions: solid amber: battery is charging; solid green: battery is fully charged; flashing amber: hard drive is active, be careful; flashing green: alarm or pTunes is active
Hardware Buttons	Top: Three-position power switch Left side: Voice Memo, Screen rotation Front: Home, Media, Files, Star, 5-way navigator

== See also ==
- Palm, Inc.
- List of Palm OS devices
- List of Palm OS software
- Palm Multi-Connector (aka Athena Connector)
- iPod Touch
- iPhone
