= Palm Universal Connector =

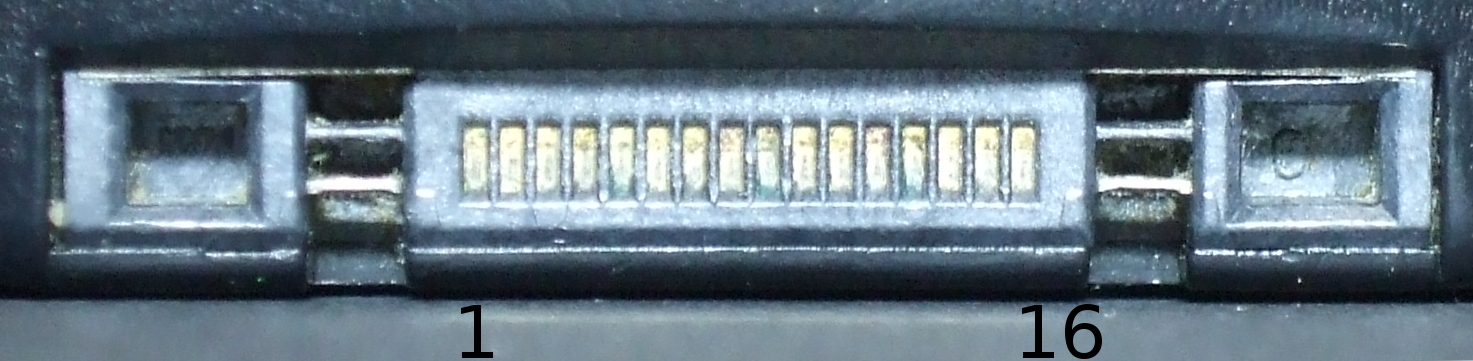
- Type: Communication, power supply, USB

Production history
- Designer: Palm, Inc.
- Superseded: Palm Serial
- Superseded by: Palm Multi-Connector

Pinout
Pin 1	Signal - ground	GND
Pin 2	Data + USB	USB_D+
Pin 3	Data - USB	USB_D-
Pin 4	USB VBUS	VCC
Pin 5	HotSync IRQ - +3.3 V push button	HOTSYNC
Pin 6	not connected	N/C
Pin 7	Signal - ground	GND
Pin 8	Peripheral ID: USB Cradle : short; Serial Cradle : 7.5 kΩ; Mfg. Test Cradle : 20 kΩ; USB Peripheral : 47 kΩ; Serial Peripheral : 100 kΩ; Modem : 220 kΩ	ID
Pin 9	power out +3.2 V, 100 mA max.	Vout
Pin 10	RxD RS-232 in, GPS T	RxD
Pin 11	TxD RS-232 out, GPS R	TxD
Pin 12	Peripheral DETECT	DETECT
Pin 13	CTS RS-232 in	CTS
Pin 14	RTS RS-232 out	RTS
Pin 15	DTR RS-232 out	DTR
Pin 16	charge +5 V, 500–700 mA	CHARGE

The Universal Connector was a standard port fitted to the bottom of many Palm PDAs from 2001 to 2004 and on units from other manufacturers that licensed Palm technology, including Garmin.

Out of the box, it is used to connect to the sync and charge cradle, allowing the Palm to connect to a desktop PC and receive battery power. A range of accessories were also available for the Universal Connector, including folding keyboards, external battery packs, wired and wireless modems, and many more.

The Universal Connector cradles were the first synchronization device that used USB to communicate with the host computer, in addition to the older serial port standard.

Some Palm devices manufactured between 2001 and 2004 did not use the Universal Connector. For instance, the Tungsten E had a mini-USB connector.

The Universal Connector was superseded by the Palm Multi-Connector for the final devices released by Palm, this standard added stereo audio output and mono microphone input.

== Palm Models fitted with the Universal Connector ==
- m125, m130
- m500, m505, m515
- Palm i705
- Zire 71
- Tungsten T, T2, T3, C, W

== Garmin Models fitted with the Universal Connector ==
- Garmin iQue 3600, 3200
