= Treo 800w =

- Manufacturer: Palm, Inc.
- Successor: Palm Treo Pro
- Compatible networks: CDMA2000 (3G)
- Dimensions: 4.41×2.28×0.73 in (112×58×19 mm)
- Weight: 4.94 oz (140 g)
- Operating system: Windows Mobile 6.1 Professional
- CPU: TI OMAP2431 (330 MHz ARM1136 + 220 MHz C64x DSP)
- Memory: 170 MB available user storage
- Removable storage: microSD up to 8 GB
- Battery: 1150 mA·h Lithium-ion
- Rear camera: 2 megapixels with 2× digital zoom
- Display: 320×320 65k colors touchscreen
- Connectivity: EVDO Rev A, 1xRTT, Bluetooth, aGPS
- Hearing aid compatibility: M4/T4

The Palm Treo 800w is a combination PDA/cell phone offered exclusively by Sprint. It is Palm's third Windows Mobile Treo. The short-lived device was replaced by the Treo Pro.

== Specifications ==
- Mobile phone, CDMA model with 800/1900-MHz bands, with EV-DO Rev.A data.
- Built-in aGPS
- Texas Instruments 333 MHz ARM-based processor
- 128 MB RAM and 256 MB flash storage (~170 MB user accessible)
- Windows Mobile 6.1 Professional
- 4.41 x 2.28 x 0.73 in (112 x 58 x 18 mm)
- 4.94 ounces (140 grams)
- 16-bit Color 320x320 TFT touchscreen display
- Supports MicroSD and MicroSDHC cards
- Built-In Bluetooth 2.0 EDR
- 2-megapixel digital camera
- Built-in 802.11b/g Wi-Fi
- 1150 mAh standard, rechargeable lithium-ion battery
- Infrared port

== Extra Features ==
The Treo 800w is the first Palm phone to support A2DP, which allows the user to stream music to a supported device wirelessly over Bluetooth.

== See also ==
- Treo 700wx - Palm's previous Windows Mobile Smartphone
- Treo Pro - the replacement for the 800w
