= Palm m500 series =

Series of PDA Handhelds made by Palm released in 2001

The Palm m500 series is a series of handheld personal digital assistants that consisted of three devices: the Palm m500, Palm m505, and Palm m515. The series was a follow-up to the Palm V series with a similar, though slightly shorter, footprint and form factor.

Like the Palm V, the series had metal cases (although the m500 had a plastic back plate) and a 160x160 resolution screen. The distinguishing features common to all in the series are a SD/MMC expansion slot, faster processor, new faster USB sync interface, new software functionality, new vibrating alarms, new indicator light, and a mechanical fastener vs. hot-glue case construction. Later models introduced an improved version of the color display and more memory.

== Palm m500 series ==
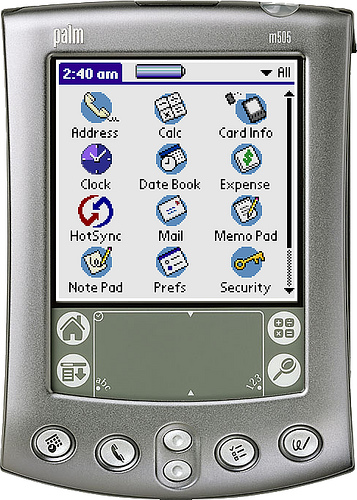
Palm m505

The Palm m500 series of Palm PDAs was released on March 6, 2001. Based on a poll conducted by Palm Computing, it was determined that the Palm V had the "definitive look" of the ideal PDA.

=== Common traits ===
All of the Palm m500 models were based on the Palm V form factor. They had the same slim case with the slight curvature to its left and right edges. The power button lit up green when in its docking cradle or when an important message was available. Inputs included four programmable buttons, two scrolling buttons, and a touch-sensitive 2-1/4" x 3" screen (including the 2-1/4" x 3/4" input area). As with most other Palm devices, data was input with a stylus using Graffiti.

Each of the m500 series models featured a Secure Digital (SD) or Multi Media Card (MMC) expansion slot. The SD/MMC slot allowed for additional memory upgrades for the devices, as well an expandable platform for add-on devices. The m500 series was also the first of Palm's devices to incorporate the new Universal Connector, which was only "universal" until the Palm T3 after which it was abandoned. It allowed for additional add-on devices and common HotSync cradles.

=== Palm m500 ===
The m500 was the entry-level model of the m500 series. With 8 MB of on-board memory, it featured a monochrome screen and all of the features common to the m500 series devices. It was released on March 6, 2001, as part of the original release for the series.

==== Details ====
Operating System: Palm OS version 4.0 (upgrade to 4.1)
Processor: 33 MHz Motorola Dragonball VZ
Memory: 8 MB
Display: 160x160 pixel B&W display, 4-bit (16 shades of gray)
Size: 4.49 x 3.02 x .46 in. (11.41 x 7.67 x 1.17 cm)
Weight: 4.162 oz (118.0 g)
Battery: Internal Lithium Polymer Rechargeable; 2hr recharge time when empty
AC Adapter: Input: 120 V 60 Hz 10 W, Output: 5.0 VDC 1.0 A
IrDA port
Expansion Slot compatible with SD and MMC cards

=== Palm m505 ===
The m505 launched alongside the m500. At launch, it was the most advanced Palm device. In addition to standard m500 series features, it also featured a 16-bit color frontlit screen.

==== Details ====
Operating System: Palm OS version 4.0 (upgrade to 4.1)
Processor: 33 MHz Motorola Dragonball VZ
Memory: 8 MB (4MB Flash + 8MB RAM)
Display: 160x160 pixel color display (65,000+ colors)
Size: 4.48 x 3.03 x 0.50 in. (11.38 x 7.70 x 1.27 cm)
Weight: 4.8 oz (140 g)
Battery: Internal Lithium Polymer Rechargeable; 2hr recharge time when empty
AC Adapter: Input: 120VAC 60 Hz 11W, Output: 5.0VDC 1.0A
IrDA port
Expansion Slot compatible with SD and MMC cards

=== Palm m515 ===
On March 4, 2002, Palm released the m515. Based on consumer reviews and surveys conducted by the company, the m515 was developed as an improved version of, and replacement for, the m505. Enhancements include 16 MB of on-board memory and an enhanced backlighting system. There was much criticism about the m505 that, even with the backlight on, it was dim and difficult to read in some environments. The m515 added an additional setting allowing the backlight to be put on "high", which was considerably brighter than its predecessor.

==== Details ====
Operating System: Palm OS version 4.1
Processor: 33 MHz Motorola Dragonball VZ
Memory: 16 MB RAM + 4 MB Flash
Display: 160x160 pixel color display (65,000+ colors)
Size: 4.48 x 3.03 x 0.50 in. (11.38 x 7.70 x 1.27 cm)
Weight: 4.8 oz (140 g)
Battery: Internal Lithium Polymer Rechargeable
AC Adapter: Input: 120VAC 60 Hz 11W, Output: 5.0VDC 1.0A
IrDA port
Expansion Slot compatible with SD and MMC cards

== See also ==
- Palm (PDA)
- Palm OS
- PalmSource, Inc.
- Palm, Inc.
- Graffiti (Palm OS)
