= Treo 700w =

2005 Windows Mobile smartphone by Palm

- Manufacturer: Palm, Inc.
- Type: Smartphone
- Lifespan: since January 2006
- Media: MMC, SD
- Operating system: Windows Mobile 5.0
- CPU: Intel XScale PXA272 Bulverde (312 MHz, 32-bit, ARMv5TE, 0.18 μm)
- Display: 16-bit color 240x240 2.5 in. TFT touchscreen display
- Input: Keypad
- Camera: 1.3-megapixel
- Touchpad: Entire screen
- Connectivity: CDMA, Bluetooth
- Power: Battery
- Predecessor: Treo 700p
- Successor: Treo 700wx

The Palm Treo 700w is a Windows Mobile-powered smartphone that was officially announced on September 26, 2005. As Palm's first Windows Mobile-powered Treo, the 700w offered an alternative for users who want or need to use Microsoft software. It was offered by Verizon Wireless, and other CDMA carriers. A newer version of this phone has been released, the Treo 700wx.

== Improvements to Windows Mobile ==
Palm updated the Windows Mobile today screen, making it much easier to dial the phone. The user can type a couple of letters of the recipient's name to select their phone number.

There is on-screen support for voice mail. Instead of waiting for numbered prompts (or needing to memorize them), the user can select an action with left-and-right arrow keys. This feature is customizable for additional voicemail (not just Verizon's), enabling the user to access work voicemail (which may have different numbered prompts from Verizon's).

== Specifications ==
- Mobile phone, CDMA model with 800/1900-MHz bands, CDMA2000 1x and CDMA2000 EV-DO networks
- Intel PXA272 312 MHz processor with Intel XScale Technology
- 128 MB (60 MB user-available) non-volatile memory (64 MB on older models)
- Removable rechargeable lithium-ion battery
- Windows Mobile 5.0.2.x Pocket PC Phone Edition
- 4.4 H × 2.3 W × 0.9 D inches (11.3 cm × 5.9 cm × 2.3 cm)
- 6.4 oz. (180 grams)
- 16-bit color 240 × 240 2.5 in TFT touchscreen display
- Supports SD, SDIO and MultiMediaCards
- Built-in Bluetooth 1.2 compliance
- 1.3-megapixel (1280×1024 resolution) digital camera with 2x digital zoom and video camera capability
- Talk time: up to 4.7 hours, standby time: up to 15 days
- No integrated Wi-fi support (Wi-fi card sold separately)
- Built-in keyboard
- Comes with stylus

== See also ==
- Treo 700p — Corresponding Palm OS device.
- Treo 700wx - Corresponding, newer Windows Mobile device offered by Sprint Wireless.
