= Treo 750 =

2007 smartphone model

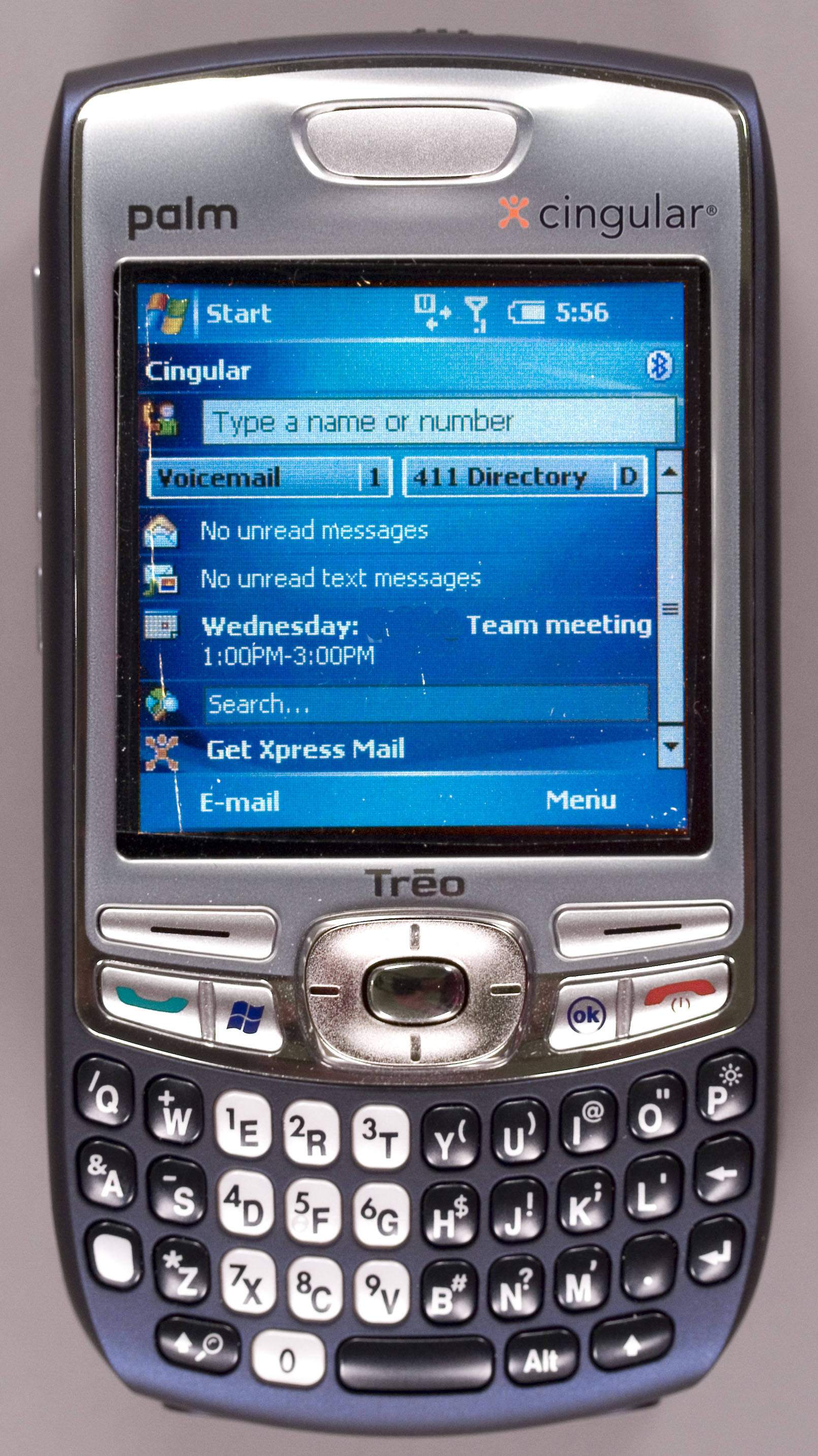
- Manufacturer: palm
- Type: Smartphone
- Lifespan: January 2007
- Media: Internal Memory (128 MB)/miniSD
- Operating system: Windows Mobile 5.2 or 6.0
- CPU: 300 MHz Samsung Processor
- Display: Color 240 x 240 TFT touchscreen display
- Input: Keypad, Touchscreen
- Camera: 1.3-megapixel
- Connectivity: GSM/UMTS, Bluetooth
- Power: Battery

The Palm Treo 750 is a GSM/UMTS smartphone released on January 8, 2007.

== Features ==
- Communications
  - UMTS tri band: UMTS 850, UMTS 1900, UMTS 2100, HSDPA (with Windows Mobile 6 upgrade)
  - GSM / GPRS / EDGE quad band: GSM 850, GSM 900, GSM 1800, GSM 1900

== Carriers ==
In the United States the Treo 750 is available with AT&T, or directly from Palm as an unlocked device. It is also available in:

- Singapore on StarHub and SingTel
- Philippines on Globe Telecom
- Italy on 3 Italia
- Austria on 3 Networks
- Netherlands on KPN
- Australia on Telstra and 3
- Canada on Rogers Wireless
- Mexico on Telcel
- UK on Vodafone UK (badged as 750v)
- Germany on Vodafone Deutschland (badged as 750v)
- Turkey on TURKCELL

== Treo 750v ==
The Palm Treo 750v is a quad-band smartphone based on Microsoft's Windows Mobile 5.0 software. It was the first Treo model to be made available in Europe based on the Windows platform: previous Treo handsets were based on the Palm OS.
