= Treo 700p =

Cell phone manufactured by Palm Inc.

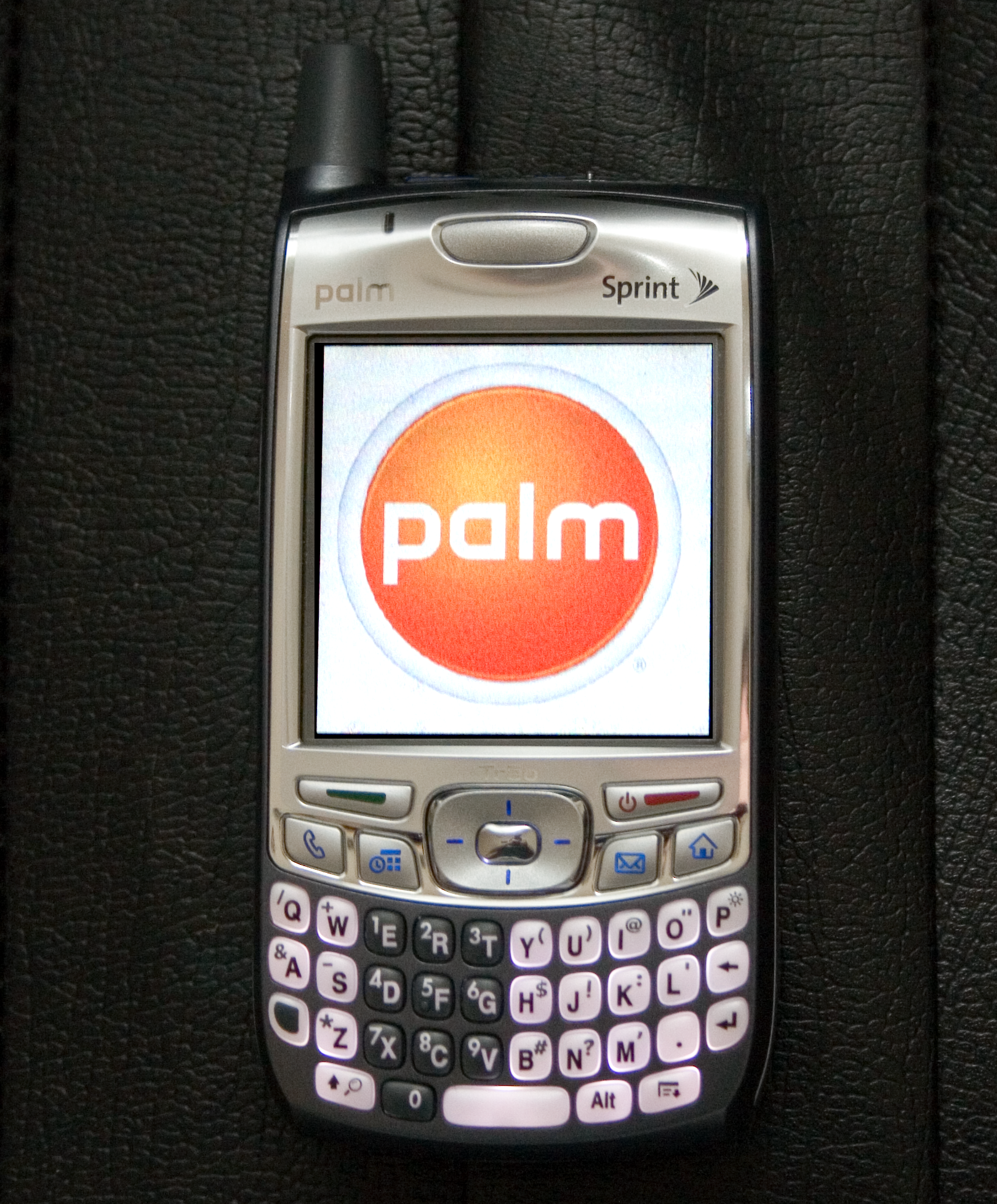
- Manufacturer: Palm, Inc.
- Type: Smartphone
- Dimensions: 4.4 in (110 mm) H 2.3 in (58 mm) W 0.9 in (23 mm) D
- Weight: 6.4 oz (180 g)
- Operating system: Palm OS 5.4.9
- CPU: Intel XScale PXA272 Bulverde (312 MHz, 32-bit, ARMv5TE, 0.18 μm)
- Battery: 1800 mAh Battery
- Rear camera: 1.3-megapixel
- Display: Color 320x320 2.8 in. TFT touchscreen display
- Media: Multimedia Card, Secure Digital card
- Connectivity: CDMA/EVDO, Bluetooth
- Data inputs: keypad, touchscreen
- Hearing aid compatibility: M3

The Palm Treo 700p is a cell phone with advanced capabilities, commonly referred to as a smartphone. Unlike the slightly earlier Treo 700w, this model is based on Palm OS. This is the first Palm OS-based Treo model to feature high-speed cellular network support, and is also the first Treo model to support Bluetooth 1.2.

While its specifications were more advanced than those of its predecessors, the Treo 700p shares an almost identical form factor with its closest relative, the Palm Treo 650. The Treo 700p was one of four Treo smartphones released in 2006.

The Treo 700p is faster than the Treo 650, and like the 650, it is able to play video from downloads using third-party software such as TCPMP. The 700p by virtue of its EVDO capability can also play live streaming video including cable TV stations. The Treo 700p was offered on Sprint and Verizon Wireless in the United States. With the release of a Palm OS client for Slingbox, Verizon and Sprint customers had the ability to watch live TV on their 700p's via a Slingbox set up in the subscriber's home. With appropriate service, it can also display the latest news and headlines in an on-demand user area.

== Carriers ==
The Treo 700 was available in the US through Sprint Nextel, Verizon Wireless, and Alltel. In Canada, it was available from Telus Mobility.

== Specifications ==
- Operating System: Palm OS 5.4.9
- Storage: 128 MB (60 user-accessible) Non-Volatile File System RAM
- Processor: Intel XScale 312 MHz
- Screen: 320 by 320 Color 2x2 in. TFT, 65,536 Colors
- External ringer on/off switch w/vibrate mode
- Wireless Antenna:
  - CDMA 800/1900 MHz digital dual-band
  - CDMA2000 EvDO Rev 0, backwards compatible with 1xRTT and IS-95 networks
- Bluetooth 1.2
- Camera: 1.3 Megapixel, 1280x1024 resolution, 2X digital zoom, automatic light balance
- Audio: 2.5 mm stereo headphone jack, compatible with wireless headsets using Bluetooth connectivity
- Input: Touchscreen, QWERTY thumb keyboard with integrated number dial pad
- Personal speakerphone
- Microphone mute option
- TTY/TDD compatibility
- 3-way calling
- Support for MultiMediaCard, SDIO, and SD cards. Palm says the device supports SD cards up to 2 GB out of the box; but Palm has released a firmware update which provides support for larger SDHC cards.
- Removable, 1800 mAh rechargeable lithium-ion battery
- Talk time up to 4.5 hours, standby time up to 300 hours
- Size 2.28" W x 5.08" H (excluding antenna) x 0.89" D; 58 mm W x 129 mm H x 23 mm D
- Weight 6.4 ounces; 180 grams

However, the phone has been described by some sources as being more “evolutionary than revolutionary” – e.g. the phone is a substantial improvement over the Treo 600 and 650 models but it does not offer new capabilities that would make the Treo 700p a quantum improvement over these and other products. The phone is also certainly not a perfect product, with many reviewers citing the following issues:

- The phone still lacks Wi-Fi capability.
- Palm OS 5.4.9, although quite stable, appears a bit dated when compared to Window's Mobile graphics and does not offer multitasking. Limited multitasking includes MP3 playback, background email synchronization and the usual telephony functions. One unusual multitasking capability is the ability to send and receive SMS easily while on a phone call.
- The phone does have voice dialing capability, but it is not accessible through a Bluetooth headset or other devices.
- A GSM version is unavailable, thus overseas roaming is somewhat restricted but available in countries that use the CDMA standard. Treo 650 (older) and Treo 680 (newer) are the nearest equivalents to a GSM version of 700p.

As of July 1, 2008, the phone is no longer listed for sale on the Palm site.

== See also ==
- Treo 680
- Palm Treo smartphones
