= Resistive touchscreen =

Touchscreen technology

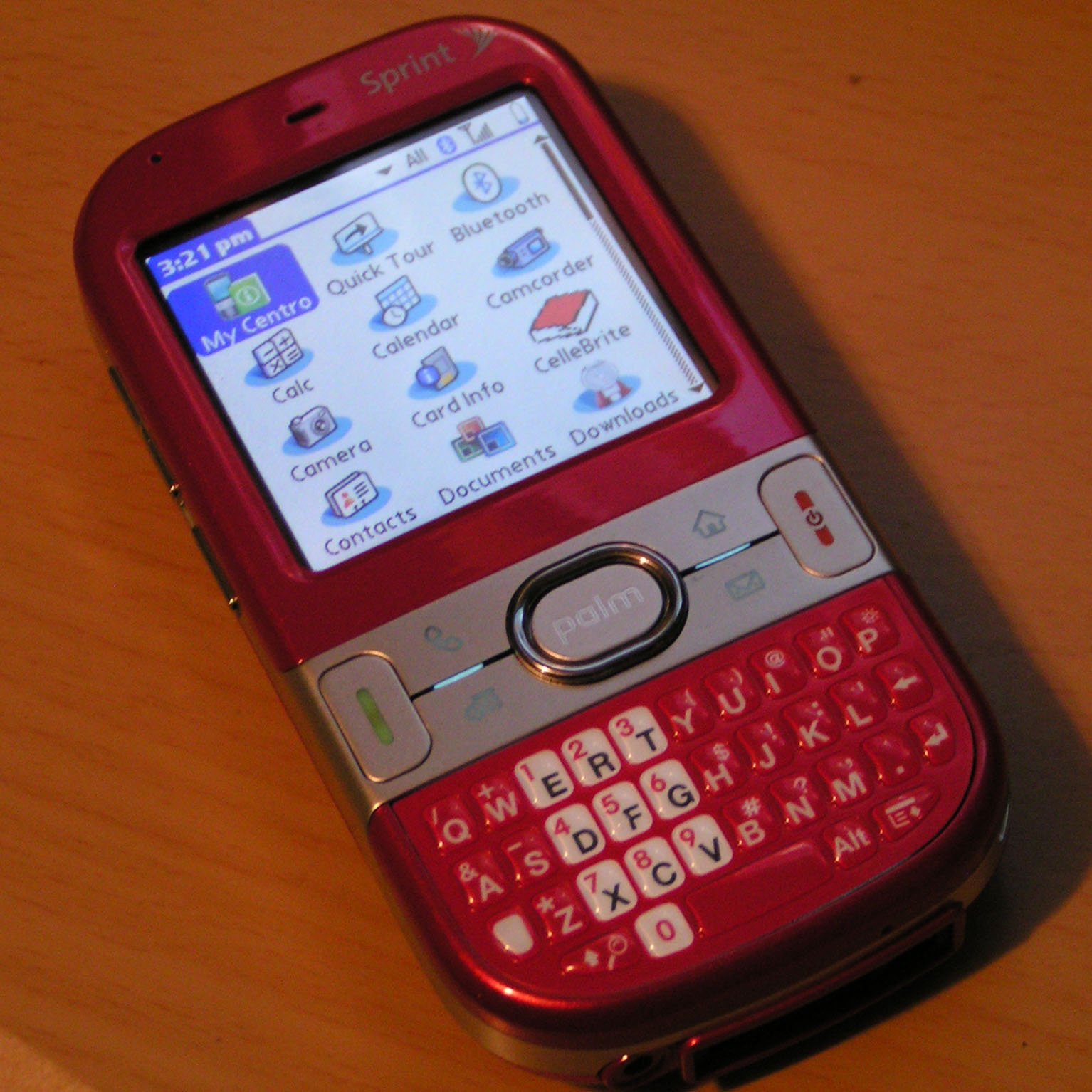
A Palm Centro, an example of a smartphone with a resistive touchscreen

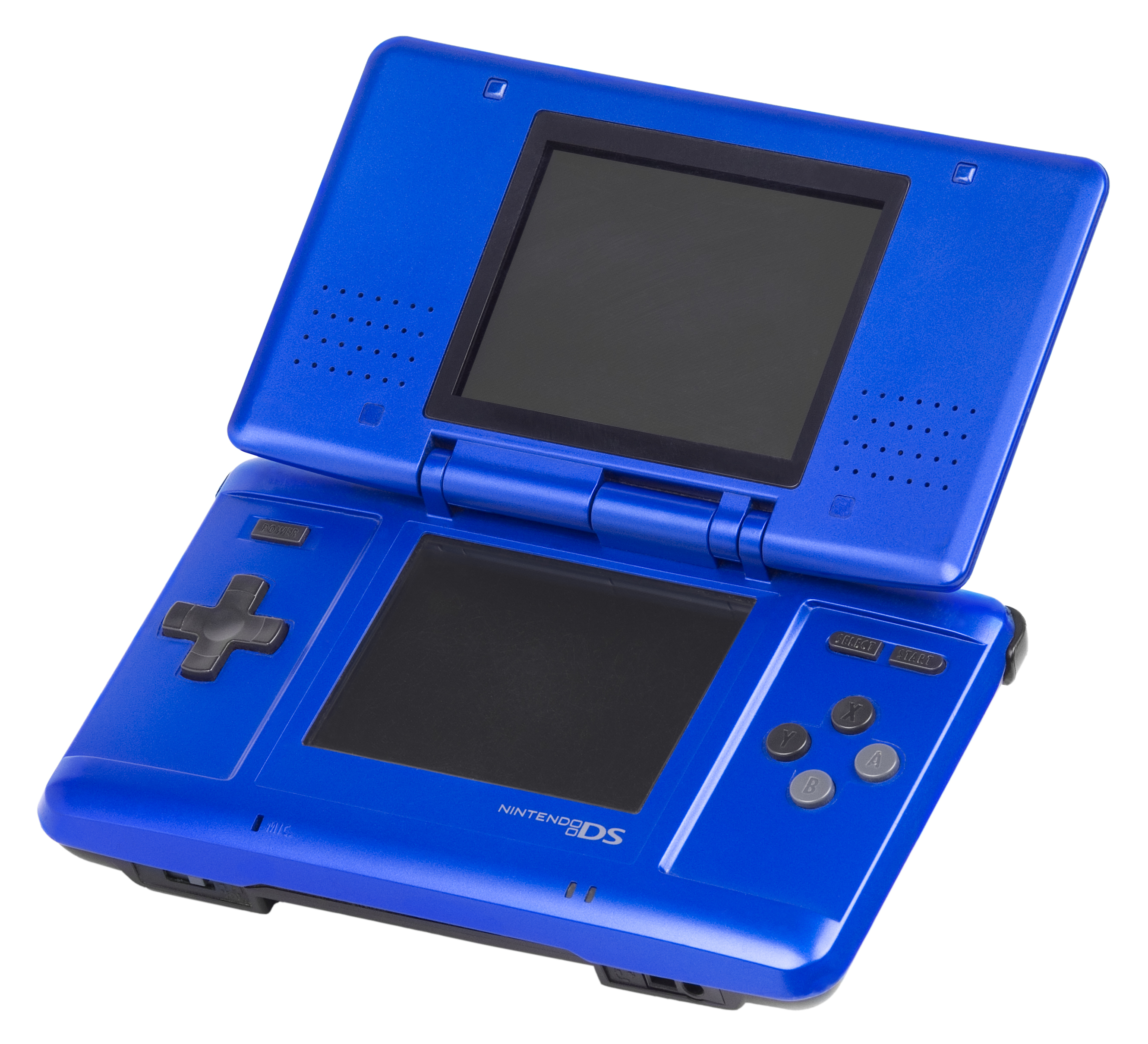
The Nintendo DS, an example of a handheld game console with a resistive touchscreen

A resistive touchscreen is a type of touch-sensitive display that works by detecting pressure applied to the screen. It is composed of two flexible sheets coated with a resistive material and separated by an air gap or microdots.

== Description and operation ==
There are two different types of metallic layers. The first type is called matrix, in which striped electrodes on substrates such as glass or plastic face each other. The second type is called analogue which consists of transparent electrodes without any patterning facing each other. As of 2011 analogue offered lowered production costs. When contact is made to the surface of the touchscreen, the two sheets are pressed together. On these two sheets there are horizontal and vertical lines that, when pushed together, register the precise location of the touch. Because the touchscreen senses input from contact with nearly any object (finger, stylus/pen, palm) resistive touchscreens are a type of "passive" technology.

For example, during the operation of a four-wire touchscreen, a uniform, unidirectional voltage gradient is applied to the first sheet. When the two sheets are pressed together, the second sheet measures the voltage as distance along with the first sheet, providing the X coordinate. When this contact coordinate has been acquired, the voltage gradient is applied to the second sheet to ascertain the Y coordinate. These operations occur within a few milliseconds, registering the exact touch location as contact is made, provided the screen has been properly calibrated for variations in resistivity.

Resistive touchscreens can have high resolution (4096 x 4096 or higher), providing accurate touch control. Because the touchscreen responds to pressure on its surface, contact can be made with a finger or any other pointing device.

== Comparison with other touchscreen technology ==
Resistive touchscreen technology works well with almost any stylus-like object, and can also be operated with gloved fingers and bare fingers alike. In some circumstances, this is more desirable than a capacitive touchscreen, which needs a capacitive pointer, such as a bare finger (though some capacitive sensors can detect gloves and some gloves can work with all capacitive screens). A resistive touchscreen operated with a stylus will generally offer greater pointing precision than a capacitive touchscreen operated with a finger. Costs are relatively low when compared with active touchscreen technologies, but are also more prone to damage. Resistive touchscreen technology can be made to support multi-touch input. Single-touch screens register multiple touch inputs in their balanced location and pressure levels.

For people who must grip the active portion of the screen or must set their entire hand down on the screen, alternative touchscreen technologies are available, such as an active touchscreen in which only the stylus creates input and skin touches are rejected. However, newer touchscreen technologies allow the use of multi-touch without the aforementioned vectoring issues.

Where conditions allow bare finger operation, the resistive screen's poorer responsiveness to light touches has caused it to generally be considered for use with low resolution screens and to lose market share to capacitive screens in the 21st century. Projected capacitive touchscreen technology overtook resistive touchscreen technology in revenue in 2010 and in units in 2011.

== See also ==
- Capacitive sensing
- Graphics tablet
- List of touch-solution manufacturers
- Pen computing
