= Treo 755p =

2007 smartphone by Palm

TREO 755p
- Manufacturer: Palm, Inc.
- Type: Smartphone
- Compatible networks: Sprint Nextel; Verizon Wireless
- Dimensions: 2.3 in (W) x 4.4 in (L) x 0.8 in (D)
- Weight: 5.6 oz (159 g)
- Operating system: Palm OS 5.4.9
- CPU: Intel PXA272 312MHz with Intel XScale Technology
- Battery: 1600 mAh Li-ion battery
- Rear camera: 1.3-megapixel
- Display: Color 320x320 TFT touchscreen display
- Media: Mini-Secure Digital card
- Connectivity: CDMA / EVDO Rev.0; Bluetooth 1.2
- Data inputs: Keypad, touchscreen
- Hearing aid compatibility: M3/T3

The Treo 755p is a smartphone developed by Palm, Inc. It was released on May 15, 2007 as the first CDMA Treo without an aerial antenna. This Treo has a form factor similar to that of the GSM Treo 680, and is equipped with the full Palm OS. It has been described as a Treo 700p in a Treo 680's body.

== Carriers ==
The Treo 755p was previously available through Sprint Nextel, Verizon Wireless, Alltel, and Telus. In Canada, the Treo 755p was available from Telus Mobility.

== Specifications ==
- Operating system: Palm OS 5.4.9
- Storage: 128 MB (60 user-accessible) Non-Volatile File System RAM
- Processor: Intel XScale 312 MHz
- Screen: 320 by 320 Color 2x2 in. TFT, 65,536 Colors
- External ringer on/off switch w/vibrate mode

Wireless Antenna:

- CDMA 800/1900 MHz digital dual-band
- CDMA2000 EvDO Rev 0, backwards compatible with 1xRTT and IS-95 networks
- Bluetooth 1.2
- Camera: 1.3 Megapixel, 1280x1024 resolution, 2X digital zoom, automatic light balance
- Audio: 2.5 mm stereo headphone jack, compatible with wireless headsets using Bluetooth connectivity
- Input: Touchscreen, QWERTY thumb keyboard with integrated number dial pad
- Personal speakerphone
- Microphone mute option
- TTY/TDD compatibility
- 3-way calling
- Support for miniSD cards
- Removable, 1600 mAh rechargeable lithium-ion battery
- Talk time up to 4.2 hours, standby time up to 240 hours
- Size 2.3" W x 4.4" H x 0.8" D; 58.4 mm W x 117 mm H x 20.3 mm D
- Weight 5.6 ounces; 159 grams

== See also ==
- Treo 680
- Treo 700p
- Palm Treo smartphones
