= Palm TX =

Personal digital assistant, 2005–2009

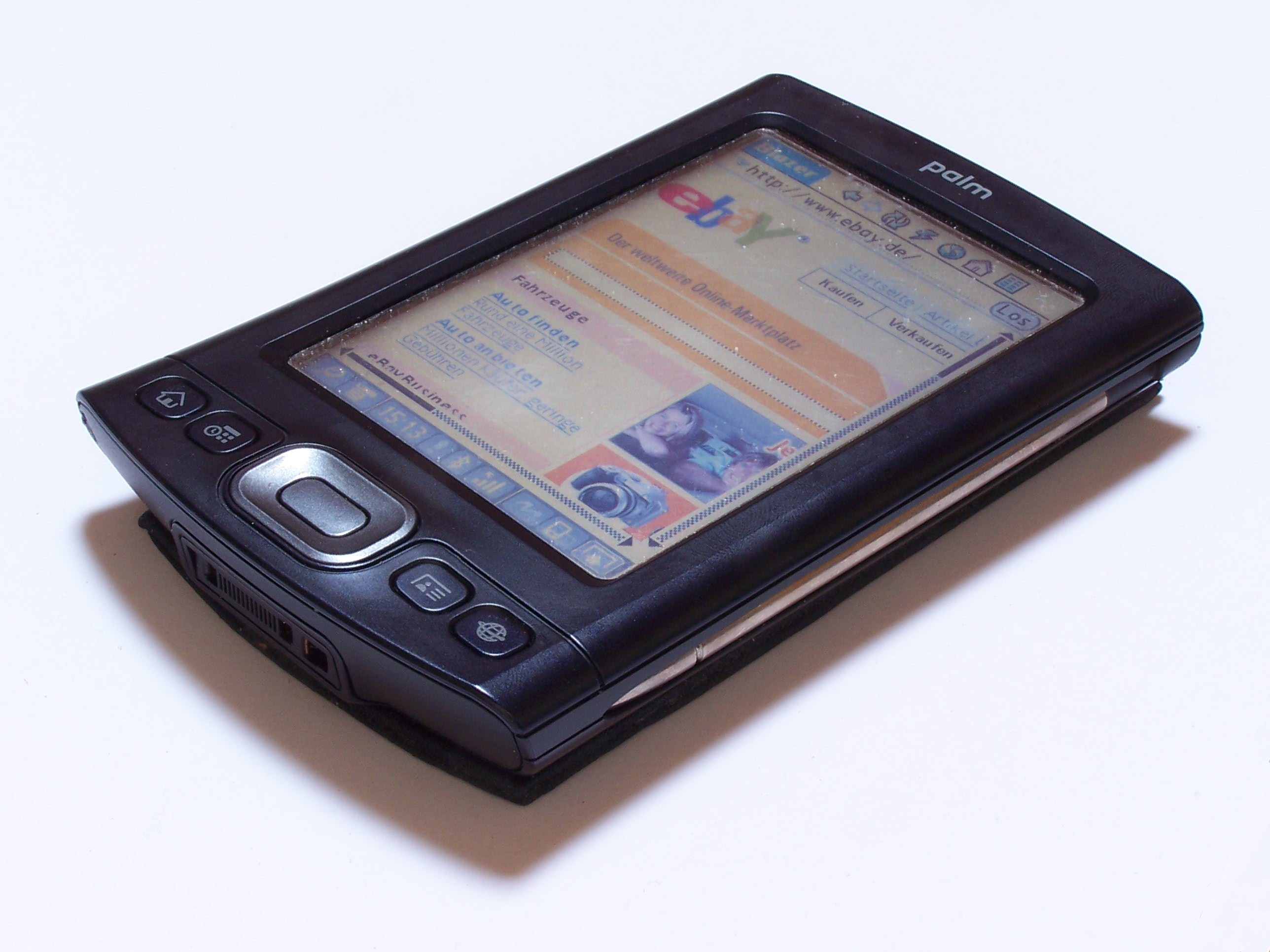
- The Palm TX
- Manufacturer: Palm, Inc.
- Type: PDA
- Lifespan: 2005–2009
- Media: 128 MiB flash memory and (1) SD/SDIO/MMC slot
- Operating system: Palm OS Garnet, 5.4.9
- CPU: 312 MHz Intel XScale PXA 270
- Memory: 32 MiB Random Access Memory, 128 MiB Flash
- Display: 3.9 in, 320x480 px TFT LCD, 16-bit color touchscreen
- Input: Touchscreen (stylus-based)
- Camera: None
- Connectivity: 802.11b Wi-Fi, Bluetooth, IrDA
- Power: 1250 mA·h rechargeable lithium-ion non-removable battery
- Dimensions: 120.9x78.22x15.5 mm (4.8x3.1x0.6 in.)
- Related: Tungsten T5

The Palm TX (written as "Palm T|X" in official documentation) is a personal digital assistant which was produced by Palm, Inc. It was announced and released as part of Palm's October 2005 product cycle, and was in production until March 2009.

== Hardware ==
Prior to its official announcement, a prototype was photographed with palmOne branding, labeled the "Tungsten XX".

== See also ==
- List of Palm OS devices
