= Palm Treo =

2002–2009 line of smartphones by Handspring and Palm

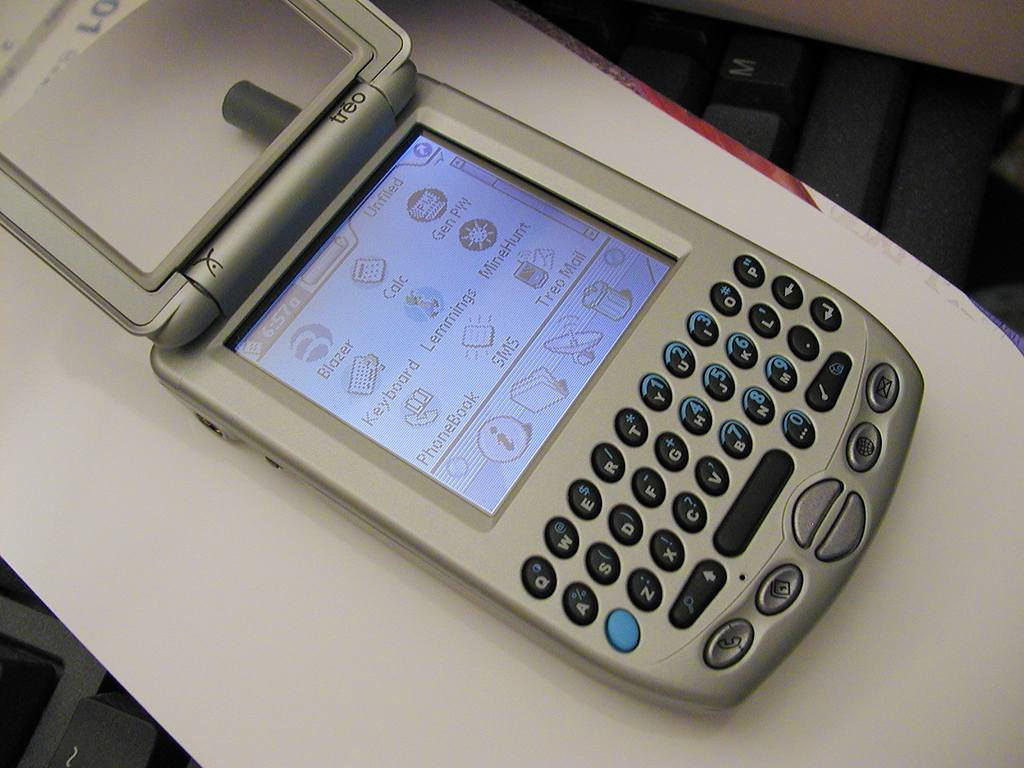
A Treo 300

The Palm Treo /ˈtriːoʊ/ (stylized as Trēo) is a discontinued line of smartphones originally developed by Handspring, which was bought by Palm, Inc. They were then manufactured and maintained by Palm, Inc. Treos had a number of integrated features such as the ability to check the calendar while talking on the phone, dial directly from a list of contacts, and send email messages. The final models included a built-in camera. Treos ran Palm OS, but later models also ran Windows Mobile. The Palm Pre, released in June 2009, replaced the Treo series.

== Treo devices ==
A total of nineteen Treo models were released, listed below in reverse chronological order. Treos through the 680 series used Palm OS. Beginning with the 700 series, Treos ran both Palm OS and Windows Mobile. The Treo 700w was the first of the 700 line, and the first Treo to use Windows Mobile. On January 5, 2009, Palm released the last Treo device, the Treo Pro on GSM. The Treo Pro on CDMA began sales in March 2009.

Officially announced models:

Release date	Models	PDA Notes	Phone Notes	Other notes	Network
2008	Palm Treo Pro (GSM) CDMA)	TFT touch screen display with a 320 × 320 pixel resolution, Windows Mobile 6.1 Professional Edition OS, preloaded with Microsoft Office Mobile Professional 6.1, 2.0 MP camera/camcorder, 256 MB user memory/128 MB program memory (expandable via microSDHC slot up to a supported memory of 32 GB ), stereo Bluetooth 2.0+EDR compliant, one touch Wi-Fi access (802.11b/g), integrated GPS, 3.5mm headphone jack.	GSM bands: 850/900/1800/1900, GPRS, EDGE, UMTS UMTS bands: 850/1900/2100, HSDPA. Released GSM August 19, 2008, CDMA March 2009.	First Palm Treo device with a flush touchscreen, Standalone GPS and aGPS, 3.5mm headphone jack (instead of 2.5mm), and the new "glossy" black (Obsidian) styling. Approximately 1/3" thinner than previous generation Treos. Made by HTC.	US: Unlocked / CDMA: Alltel, Sprint-Nextel Canada: Bell Mobility Telus Mobility. Australia: Telstra Europe: O_{2} and Vodafone.
2008	Palm Treo 800w (CDMA)	TFT touch screen display of 16k colors with a 320 × 320 pixel resolution, Windows Mobile 6.1 OS, preloaded with Microsoft Office Mobile Professional 6.1, 2.0 MP camera/camcorder, 256 MB user memory/128 MB program memory (expandable via microSD slot up to a supported memory of 8 GB ), stereo Bluetooth 2.0+EDR compliant, one touch Wi-Fi access, integrated GPS.	CDMA 800/1900 MHz dual-band digital voice network access, EV-DO Rev A (backwards compatible with EV-DO Rev 0 and 1XRTT). Sprint Nextel is the exclusive North American wireless carrier of the Palm Treo 800w at launch date (July 13, 2008).	First Palm Treo device to support the A2DP Bluetooth Profile, integrated aGPS and have embedded Wi-Fi. Product SKU PTR800HK.	Sprint
2007	Palm Centro (CDMA), (GSM)	320 × 320 pixel resolution, removable battery, 1.3 MP camera, Bluetooth 1.2, Palm OS 5	CDMA 800/1900 MHz digital dual-band, CDMA2000 EvDO network, backwards compatible with 1xRTT networks. Sprint exclusive at launch date. Released October 14, 2007. For AT&T, GSM bands: 850/900/1800/1900, GPRS, EDGE	Product SKU PTR690HK aligns this phone with the Treo family, however it was branded the Palm Centro. Made by Inventec.	AT&T/Sprint/Verizon Canada: Bell Mobility, Rogers Wireless. Australia: Telstra
2007	Treo 500v (GSM)	320 × 240 pixel resolution, no touchscreen, removable battery, 2 MP VGA camera, Bluetooth 1.2, Windows Mobile 6.0	GSM, GPRS, EDGE, UMTS-class 10 radio Quad band (850/900/1800/1900 MHz)	Launched September 12, 2007 on Vodafone networks. Features TPP interface over Windows Mobile 6.0 Standard edition. Made by Asus.	Vodafone
2007	Treo 755p (CDMA)	320 × 320 pixel resolution, removable battery, 1.3 MP camera (subject to change), Bluetooth, Palm OS 5	CDMA 800/1900 MHz digital dual-band, CDMA2000 EvDO network, backwards compatible with 1xRTT networks. First CDMA Treo to lose aerial antenna. Released May 2007.		Sprint/Verizon Canada: Telus, Rogers Wireless.
2006	Treo 750v and 750 (GSM)	240 × 240 pixel resolution, removable battery, 1.3 MP camera, Bluetooth 1.2, Windows Mobile	GSM GSM bands: 850/900/1800/1900, GPRS, EDGE, UMTS UMTS bands: 850/1900/2100, HSDPA (via unsupported software patch)		AT&T Australia: Telstra
2006	Treo 680 (GSM)	320 × 320 pixel resolution, removable battery, 0.3 MP VGA camera, Bluetooth 1.2, Palm OS 5	GSM, GPRS, EDGE-class 10 radio Quad band (850/900/1800/1900 MHz)	First Treo phone without an external antenna. Made by Inventec.	AT&T/Rogers Australia: Telstra
2006	Treo 700wx (CDMA)	240 × 240 pixel resolution screen, Bluetooth 1.2 wireless support, removable battery, 1.3 MP camera, Windows Mobile	800/1900 MHz digital dual-band Palm Treo 700wx smartphone for Verizon Wireless CDMA2000 EvDO network—compatible with 1xRTT network		Alltel/Sprint/Verizon
2006	Treo 700p (CDMA)	320 × 320 pixel resolution screen, Bluetooth 1.2 wireless support, removable battery, 1.3 MP camera, Palm OS 5	CDMA 800/1900 MHz digital dual-band, CDMA2000 EvDO network-backwards compatible with 1xRTT and IS95 networks		Sprint/Verizon
2006	Treo 700w (CDMA)	240 × 240 pixel resolution screen, originally 32MB RAM, Bluetooth 1.2 wireless support, removable battery, 1.3 MP camera, Windows Mobile	CDMA2000 EvDO network—backwards compatible with 1xRTT network		Sprint/Verizon
2004	Treo 650 (CDMA)	320 × 320 pixel resolution screen, Bluetooth 1.1 wireless support, removable battery, 0.3 MP camera, Palm OS 5Made by HTC.	CDMA model: 800/1900 MHz digital dual-band		
2004	Treo 650 (GSM)	320 × 320 resolution screen, Bluetooth 1.1 wireless support, removable battery, 0.3 MP camera, Palm OS 5	GSM, GPRS, EDGE-class 10 radio Quad band (850/900/1800/1900 MHz)		Australia: Telstra
2003	Treo 600 (CDMA)	Color screen, five-way navigator, backlit keyboard, Palm OS 5, no camera		candy bar form factor	Sprint/Verizon
2003	Treo 600 (CDMA)	Color screen, five-way navigator, backlit keyboard, Palm OS 5, camera		candy bar form factor	Sprint/Verizon
2003	Treo 600 (GSM)	Color screen, five-way navigator, backlit keyboard, Palm OS 5, camera	Quad-band GSM	candy bar form factor	Australia: Telstra
2003	Treo 300 (CDMA)	Color screen, backlit keyboard		flip form factor	Sprint
2002	Treo 270 (GSM)	Color screen, backlit keyboard	Dual-band GSM	flip form factor	
2002	Treo 180g (GSM)	Monochrome screen, Graffiti input instead of keyboard	Dual-band GSM	flip form factor	
2002	Treo 180 (GSM)	Monochrome screen	Dual-band GSM	flip form factor	
2002	Treo 90	Only a PDA, runs Palm OS 4.1H, 160×160 12-bit CSTN color display, internal battery	no phone component is built-in	-	
