= Palm Centro =

Palm smartphone

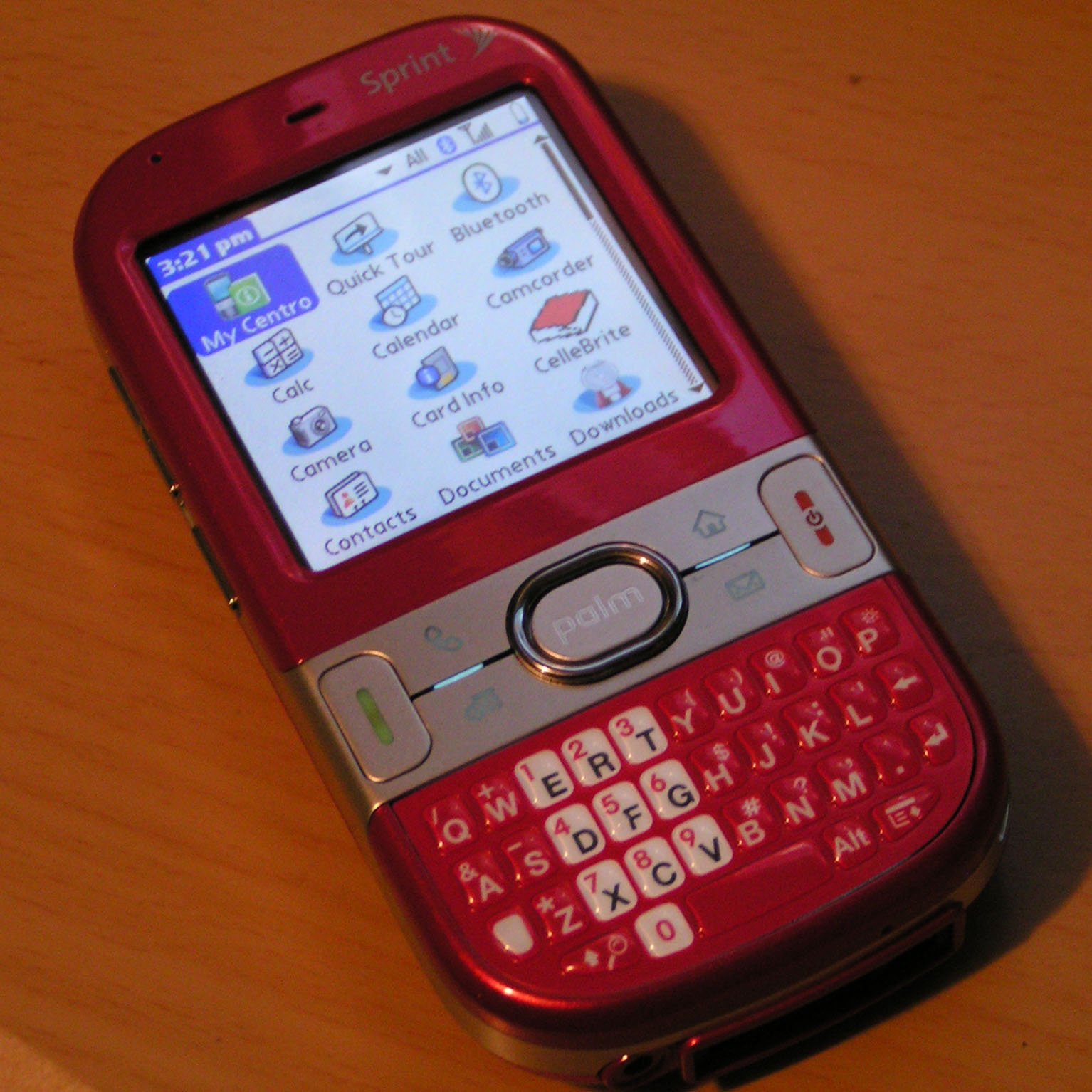
- The red Palm Centro
- Manufacturer: Palm, Inc.
- Compatible networks: CDMA2000 (3G), GSM
- Dimensions: 4.22 × 2.11 × 0.73 in (107 × 54 × 18.5 mm)
- Weight: 4.2 oz (119 g)
- Operating system: Palm OS 5.4.9
- CPU: 312 MHz Intel XScale PXA270
- Memory: 64 MB available user storage, 128 MB available user storage (Revision II)
- Removable storage: microSD up to 4 GB (up to 16 GB with modification)
- Battery: 1150 mAh Lithium-ion
- Rear camera: 1.3 megapixels with 2× digital zoom
- Display: 320×320 65k colors touchscreen
- Connectivity: EVDO, 1xRTT, Bluetooth, Infrared, USB
- Hearing aid compatibility: M4/T4

The Palm Centro is a smartphone marketed by Palm, Inc. and released on October 14, 2007, offering the functionality of the larger Treo 755p in a smaller size.

The Centro was one of the last devices to run the Palm OS operating system. The successor to Palm OS is webOS, which debuted on the Palm Pre in June 2009.

Past its original release, the Centro continued with some carriers, but not with others. 2G GSM devices, such as the AT&T Centro, could no longer connect to the AT&T network. Verizon's and Sprint's 3G CDMA networks also shut down in 2022, so CDMA Centro devices only work offline.

== Specifications ==
With a weight of 119 grams (4.2 oz), and dimensions of 4.2 by 2.1 by 0.7 inches (10.7 cm × 5.3 cm × 1.8 cm), the Centro was the smallest-ever Palm smartphone at the time of its introduction. It included a 1.3-megapixel digital camera with video capture capabilities, a microSD card slot (officially supporting up to 8 GB microSD cards, though in practice, microSD cards up to 64 GB work), touch-screen navigation, and a QWERTY keyboard. The phone was available with either CDMA technology supporting EVDO Rev 0 for network access or GSM. The stock battery allows for up to 3.5 hours of continuous talk time. The phone also offered internet connection tethering to laptop or desktop computers.

An AC travel charger and a USB data cable were included with the phone.

Palm upgraded the available memory from 64 MB to 128 MB, but the updated models were available only with Sprint.

The Palm Centro also had support for (Java) MIDP 2.0, though Palm discontinued distributing it for licensing reasons.

The product SKU on this model was PTR690HK, which was aligned with products in the Trēo family of Palm smartphones. The Verizon Wireless SKU was CENTRO690P.

== Operating system ==
The Centro ran Palm OS 5.4.9. Because of the backward compatibility features included in Palm OS, most applications released for older Palm devices also worked with the Centro.

== Carriers ==
=== Sprint ===
Sprint marketed the original Centro in red, black, and pink.

In October 2008, it released the second-generation Centro in two new colors, Olive Green and Vibrant Rose. The new model had twice as much user-accessible storage as the preceding model. It also featured a rubberized soft-touch coating.

=== AT&T ===
The AT&T version was available in black, white, and electric blue. It uses the GSM cellular network for connectivity and does have some differences from Sprint's CDMA version. The GSM-based device was quad-band (850/900/1800/1900 MHz) and supported both GPRS and EDGE data protocols. Even though the Sprint and Verizon versions of the Centro supported 3G (EV-DO), the AT&T version did not; it was a 2G-only device.

PC Magazine wrote: "The Centro for AT&T sacrifices the Sprint version's high-speed data access, but you get more battery life—though not quite enough. Nonetheless, the low price makes it a good first smartphone."

The AT&T Centro also offered a Push-To-Talk walkie-talkie-like service not available on the CDMA device, allowing the user to instantly see the availability of contacts and make individual or group Push-To-Talk calls.

=== Verizon ===
The Verizon version of the Centro, available in dark blue only, was released on June 12, 2008, for $99 with a two-year contract and a $70 mail-in rebate. This version ran on a 1xRTT/1xEV–DO (Rel. 0) 3G network.

=== Claro ===
Claro introduced the Centro to the Brazilian market by the beginning of 2008.

=== Telstra ===
Telstra Australia saw the Centro offered via prepaid only. Good Gear Guide wrote: "The first smartphone with a full QWERTY keyboard to be sold in Australia on prepaid". The device was white, but, unlike the green number pad seen on AT&T's Centro, this version had a grey number pad.

=== Rogers Wireless ===
Rogers Wireless (Canada) announced that it would carry the Palm Centro from June 10, 2008. It was available only in dark blue. For new activations on a three-year $45+ plan, the Centro initially sold for $299.99. For renewals on any three-year voice-and-data plan, it sold for $199.99.

=== Unlocked GSM ===
On June 25, 2008, an unlocked GSM version of the Centro was released for use on all 850/900/1800/1900 MHz GSM telephone networks. It was available in Glacier White with grey keyboard accents.

=== Bell Mobility ===
On February 2, 2009, a CDMA version of the Palm Centro in Midnight Black was released on the Bell Mobility network. The phone sold for $49.95 with a new activation on a 3-year $45+ voice and data package. This version of the Centro ran on a 1xRTT/1xEV–DO (Rel. 0) 3G network.

== Popularity ==
On July 29, 2008, Palm announced they had sold over two million Centros. According to AdMob, in August 2008, the Palm Centro was the second-ranked US smartphone based on internet traffic, responsible for 78% of the traffic on Palm devices; it fell to fourth in February 2009, responsible for 86% of Palm traffic.

== Advertising ==
In December 2008, Palm created a holiday advertising campaign, introducing a new version of Santa Claus, called "Claus", and complemented the TV spots with a Facebook page, viral videos, and original music in download form.
