= Treo 680 =

Mobile phone model

Palm Trēo 680
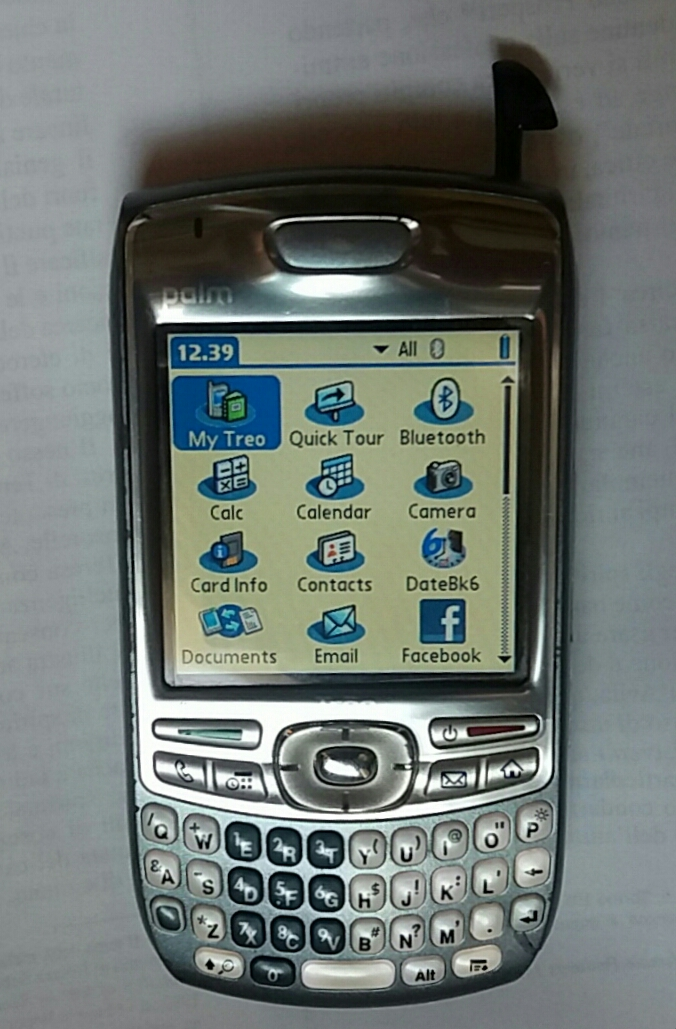
- Manufacturer: PalmOne
- Series: Trēo
- Availability by region: November 2006
- Predecessor: Cingular Wireless Trēo 650 (GSM)
- Successor: AT&T Palm Centro (GSM)
- Compatible networks: Quad band (850/900/1800/1900) GSM
- Dimensions: 111.8 mm H x 58.4 mm W x 20.3 mm D (4.4 inches H x 2.3 inches W x 0.8 inches D)
- Weight: 158 g (5.6 oz)
- Operating system: Palm OS Garnet v5.4.9
- CPU: Intel 312 MHz XScale PXA270 (Bulverde)
- Memory: 128 MB (64 MB user available storage)
- Removable storage: MMC, SD/SDHC/SD I/O
- Battery: 1200 mAh Li-ion battery
- Rear camera: 640x480 VGA (0.3-megapixel) with 2× digital zoom and video capture support
- Display: 320×320 65k color illuminated TFT LCD touchscreen
- Connectivity: GSM/GPRS/EDGE class 10 radio, Bluetooth, IrDA, Dial-Up Networking
- Data inputs: QWERTY Keypad and touchscreen

The Palm Treo 680 is a combination hybrid PDA/cellphone, or smartphone as the successor to the company's Treo 650.

It was the first-ever Palm OS Treo with no external antenna.

The Treo 680 is older, larger, and heavier than the Palm Centro. But the Treo 680 has a larger keyboard which is more comfortable to type on. There are other differences between the Treo 680 and the Centro. An article on the Treonauts weblog includes a good comparison chart and some in-depth commentary.

== Specifications ==
- Mobile phone, Broadcom BCM2133 M-Stream chipset providing GSM/GPRS/EDGE Class 10 model with 850/900/1800/1900 MHz bands.
- Built-In Bluetooth 1.2 Compliance - Broadcom BCM2045 "Blutonium" Bluetooth Chipset
- XScale PXA270 (Bulverde) 312 MHz processor
- 64 MB onboard NAND storage as user-available stored non-volatile memory
- 64 MB onboard NOR StrataFlash (part of the PXA CPU)
- 32 MB onboard SDRAM split between system memory, dynamic memory and cache
- 1200 mAh removable rechargeable lithium-ion battery
- Palm OS Garnet version 5.4.9
- 111.8 mm H x 58.4 mm W x 20.3 mm D (4.4 inches H x 2.3 inches W x 0.8 inches D)
- 158 grams (5.6 ounces)
- 16-bit color LCD 320 x 320 TFT touch-screen display
- IrDA transceiver
- Supports SD, SD I/O, SDHC and MultiMediaCards - 4 GB to 32 GB cards supported through SDHC
- Dial-Up Networking (via USB cable or Bluetooth)
- 0.3-megapixel (640x480) VGA digital camera with 2x digital zoom and video camera capability
- Palm Desktop version 4.1.4 for Windows and version 4.2 for Mac OS
- Documents To Go version 8 included in ROM
- Stylus

== Carriers ==
AT&T and Rogers were the only carriers to offer the Treo 680 in North America; but, for a more expensive price, you could get an unlocked GSM Treo that worked with any GSM/GPRS/EDGE network worldwide. The Treo 680 was also available from many carriers worldwide including Singtel, Vodafone in New Zealand & Australia, Globe, Orange France, Swisscom, Telcel, Cable & Wireless (Caribbean) and Claro in Brazil.

== Colors ==
The Treo 680 came in several colours: Arctic, Copper, Crimson, and Graphite. Initially, Graphite was the only colour available to wireless carriers, with the Arctic, Copper and Crimson models available unlocked exclusively through Palm.com and Palm's retail stores. This policy was reversed in the US, with Graphite the only color available unlocked and AT&T along with Rogers selling the colored models. In other countries, unlocked color models were available.

== See also ==
- Palm Treo smartphones
