= Treo 650 =

2004 Palm OS–based smartphone by Palm

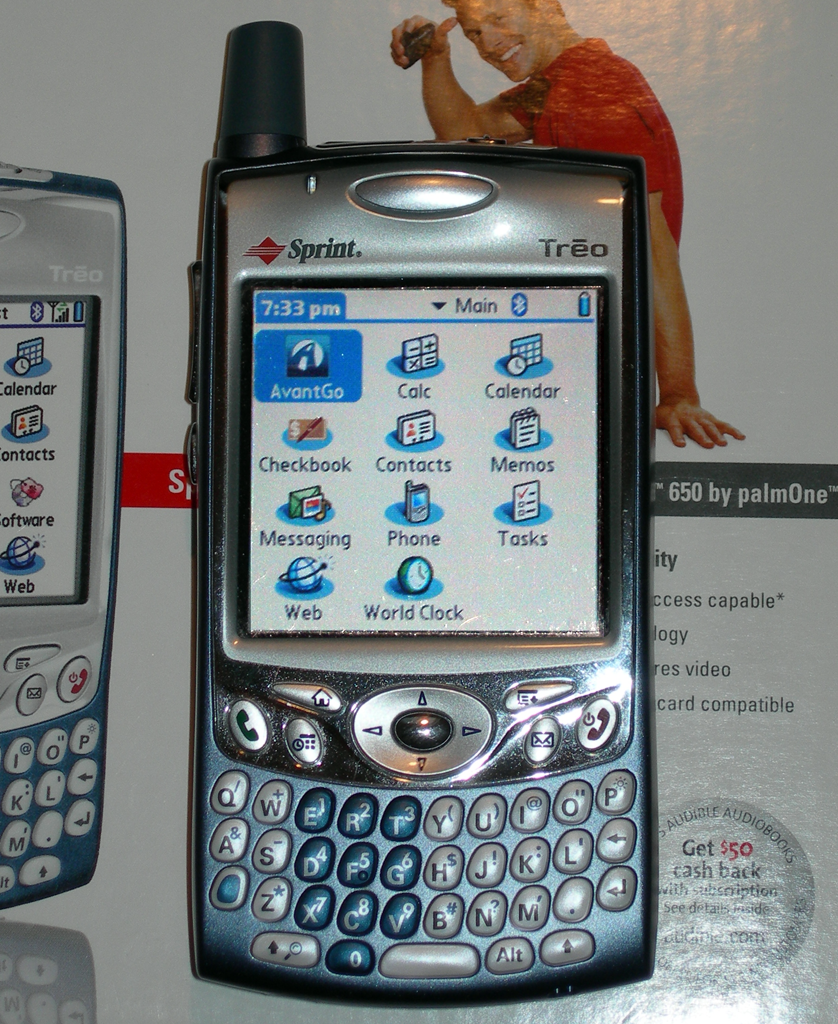
- Manufacturer: Palm
- Type: Smartphone
- Lifespan: October 2001 - 2008
- Media: MMC, SD
- Operating system: Palm OS 5.4.x
- CPU: Intel XScale PXA272 Bulverde (312 MHz, 32-bit, ARMv5TE, 0.18 μm)
- Display: 2.7-inch 320×320 16-bit illuminated TFT LCD
- Input: Keypad, touchscreen
- Camera: 0.3-megapixel
- Touchpad: WM9712 AC'97 digitizer
- Connectivity: GSM / GPRS / EDGE, CDMA2000, Bluetooth, IrDA, HAC-M3
- Power: 1800 mAh battery
- Dimensions: 2.3 × 4.4 × 0.9 in (112 x 58 x 23 mm)
- Weight: 6.3 oz
- Predecessor: Treo 600

The Palm Treo 650 is a Palm OS-based smartphone, the successor to Palm's Treo 600. It began shipping in November 2004, and was discontinued in 2008.

== Specifications ==
Type	Specification
Modes	CDMA2000 850 / 1900; GSM/GPRS
Weight	6.30 oz (179 g)
Dimensions	4.40 in × 2.30 in × 0.90 in (112 mm × 58 mm × 23 mm)
Form factor	Bar stub antenna
Battery life	Talk: 5.00 hours (300 minutes) Standby: 300 hours (12.5 days)
Battery type	1800 mAh lithium-ion removable
Display	Type: LCD (color TFT/TFD); Colors: 65,536 (16-bit); Size: 320 × 320 pixels TFT
Platform / OS	Palm OS version 5.4 / 312 MHz Intel PXA270 processor
Memory	32 MB (Non-Volatile File System built-in, flash shared memory) (23 MB available)
Phone Book capacity	shared memory
FCC ID	O8FMADECA (Approved Oct 25, 2004)
Bluetooth	1.1 compliant; supported profiles: headset, hands-free, serial (sync), dial-up networking (carrier-dependent)
Camera	0.3-megapixel (640×480) VGA digital camera with 2× digital zoom and video camera capability
Email client	Protocols supported: IMAP, POP3, Microsoft Exchange supports attachments (photos, HTML, Word, Excel)
Expansion card	Card Type: SD / MMC supports SDIO
Headset jack (2.5 mm)	stereo
High-speed data	Technology: 1xRTT
Integrated PDA	OS: Palm OS 5.4
MMS	integrated with SMS (inbox and outbox)
Side keys	volume keys, shortcut key
Text keyboard	Layout: QWERTY
Text Messaging	two-way: yes; integrated with MMS (inbox and outbox) with "chat" functionality
Video capture	QVGA resolution (320 × 240 pixels) / MPEG-4 format
Wireless Internet	supports frames
WLAN	No
HSCSD	No
3G	No
Alarm	Yes
Calculator	Yes
Calendar	Yes
Custom graphics	Yes
Custom ring tones	Yes
Data-capable	Yes
Games	Yes
GPS / Location	No, but a GPS receiver can be connected via Bluetooth
Infrared (IR)	Yes
Multiple numbers per name	Yes
Music player	Yes
PC sync	Yes
Picture ID	Yes
Polyphonic ring tones	Yes
Speaker phone	Yes
To-do list	Yes
Touch screen	Yes
Vibrate	Yes

=== Carriers ===
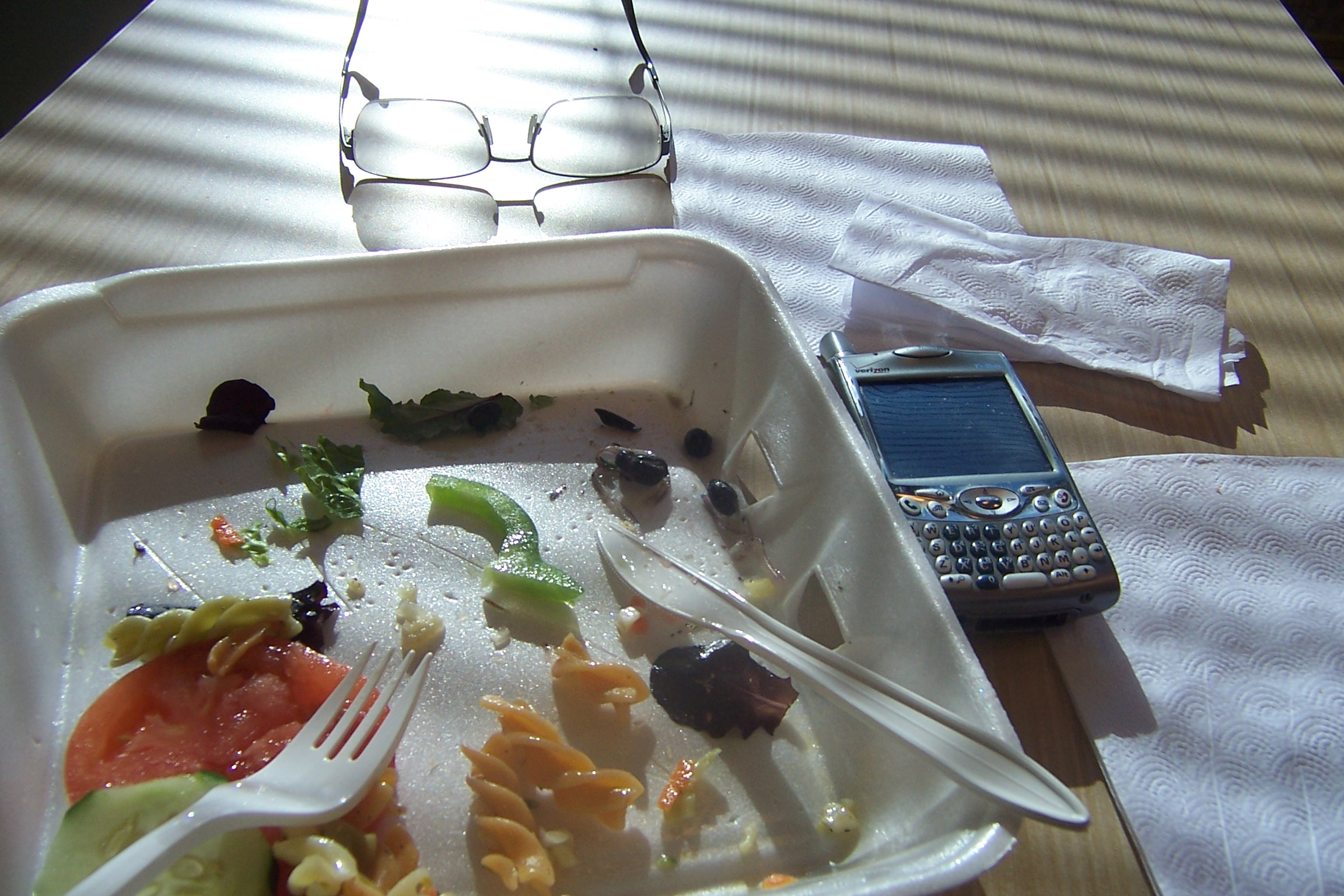
Reading news sites on a Verizon Wireless Treo 650 while eating lunch

The following GSM and CDMA2000 mobile phone operators currently or previously offered a custom-branded (OEM) version of the Treo 650:

In release order

- Sprint PCS (USA)
- Cellular South
- Cingular Wireless (including AT&T Wireless customers) (USA)
- Unlocked GSM
- Rogers Wireless (Canada)
- Verizon Wireless (USA)
- Earthlink Wireless (USA)
- Bell Mobility (Canada)
- Telus Mobility (Canada)
- Alltel (USA)
- Centennial Wireless (USA)

As seen on Palm's support page, these carriers are the sole providers of support for the OEM phones.

=== Other carriers ===
Nextel (USA) and other iDEN providers are not compatible with the Treo 650, as this technology has not been integrated into the Treo platform. T-Mobile (USA) and other GSM carriers not listed above are compatible with the unlocked version of the GSM Treo 650.

== NVFS controversy ==
At the time of its release, a significant number of users experienced problems with Palm's new Non-Volatile File System, or NVFS, based on the FAT filesystem. Compared to the Treo 600, the previous version of the Treo, the Treo 650 used more memory per file as the FAT filesystem rounded file sizes to the next highest 512-byte multiple. Because of the larger file sizes, some users upgrading to the Treo 650 from the Treo 600 were unable to fit the contents of their old device into the same amount of memory on the new device.

To remedy the initial complaints, Palm offered a free 128 MB SD flash card to Treo 650 users. Later ROM updates have resolved many of the performance, instability and storage inefficiency issues.

Other main concerns surrounding the Treo 650 (during its initial release period) were as follows:

- Some users experienced random resets at one time or another. Although the cause was unknown, a complete reset via the Reset button on the back of the phone under the battery door could keep the phone stable and running most of the day.
- Some users also reported problems with the unit's microphone. They claimed that voice clarity on the recipient's end of the connection was poor, akin to talking "inside a cardboard box." (koreth, Slashdot). Users have found that bluetooth-enabled wireless headsets or fixed headsets seemed to be an effective work-around.
- Another problem people reported is that the handset's earpiece made it difficult to hear in loud environments. Using a bluetooth-enabled wireless headset would also take care of this problem.
- Further issues include static or buzzing in the background of a conversation, the recipient's voice sounding buzzy as if they were speaking through a kazoo, and the phone failing to notify the user that a text message was received until the user activated the phone's screen at which point the phone would place a false timestamp on the message and act as if it had just been received.

=== Firmware solutions ===
On March 22, 2005, palmOne released the first ROM/Firmware Update (v1.12) for Sprint-branded phones which alleviated the NVFS inefficiency, random resets and the microphone problems. This was followed by a second firmware update on June 16, 2005. The Unlocked GSM Firmware Upgrade (v1.13) was also released on the day of the second Sprint Treo 650 firmware update which also addresses the problems first fixed with the first Sprint Treo 650 firmware update. The Rogers Wireless Treo 650 Firmware Update was quietly posted at the Rogers Wireless Treo 650 support site, and like the Unlocked GSM Firmware Update, fixes the main concerns during the initial release period. The initial release of the Verizon Wireless Treo 650 and the Earthlink Wireless Treo 650 already has the main concerns assessed, including the NVFS Memory System fix. On July 19, 2005, the Verizon Wireless firmware update was released. On July 25, 2005, Cingular released firmware version 1.15, and updated to 1.17 on November 21. Unlocked GSM 1.20 was released Mar 2006.

The latest (and last) GSM firmware revision is 01.71 (released 2006), with 01.31 released late 2005.

Treo 650 users are encouraged to deploy the latest version of the Treo 650 firmware available for their radio type (GSM or CDMA2000) and carrier branding.

== Special Editions ==
Two special editions existed of the Treo 650, the first a "special colour edition" released in 2006 with spare battery and PalmOne 256MB Card included, this apparently targeted the Japanese market with extra Language functionality available in the preferences menu.

The second was named the "Black tie" limited edition targeting the Asia/Pacific region, released in 2006 and limited to 2000 units, an all black Silicone coated device celebrating 10 years of Palm, these also carried the "Palm" as opposed to the "PalmOne" logo. The "Black Tie" came with a "multi-function" stylus and a Hard case.

Both however had identical hardware functionality with the original.

== Treo Ace ==
The Treo Ace was the rumored code name for PalmOne's Treo 650 smartphone introduced at the October 2004 CTIA Conference in San Francisco. The rumors for this product began on June 27, 2004, when TreoCentral posted detailed specifications and mockup drawings for the product. That article started the flow of hyped demand and interest for the Treo's launch that fall

The current firmware updates for the device contain a directory by the name of Ace_Update, confirming the original internal code name. A string inside the Bluetooth driver file indicates that another internal code name may have been "Ace Ventura", a reference to the movie of the same name.

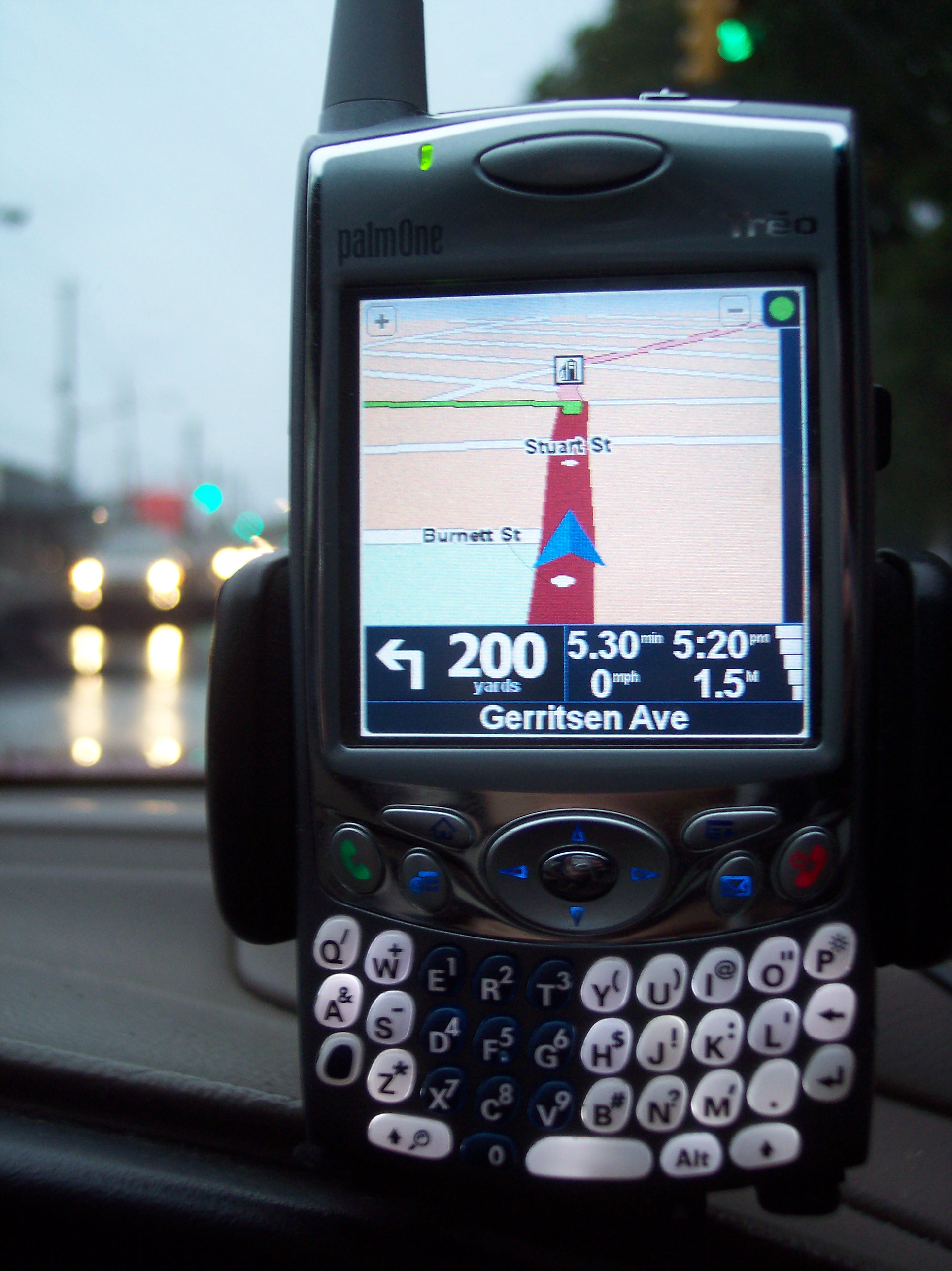
Treo 650 running TomTom Navigator 6

== Linux ==
The Treo 650 can boot Linux using a SD card and the cocoboot application.

== Successor Palm OS products ==
The Treo 650 was superseded by the Treo 755p (CDMA2000), and the Treo 680 (GSM).

== See also ==
- Non-Volatile File System
- Palm Treo Smartphone Line
