= Palm, Inc. =

1992–2010 American electronics company

- Formerly: palmOne, Inc. (2003–2005)
- Type: Subsidiary
- Traded as: Nasdaq: PALM
- Industry: Computer hardware and software
- Founded: 1992; 34 years ago United States
- Founder: Jeff Hawkins
- Defunct: 1 July 2010 (company); 2011 (brand)
- Fate: Acquired by HP, retired use of Palm brand
- Successor: Hewlett Packard Enterprise, HP Inc.
- Headquarters: Sunnyvale, California, U.S.
- Key people: Jon Rubinstein (former SVP and general manager); Donna Dubinsky; Ed Colligan
- Products: PalmPilot, Z22, Palm IIIc, Tungsten E2, TX, Treo 650, Treo 700p, Treo 755p, Treo 680, Treo 700w, Treo 700wx, Treo 750, Centro, Treo Pro, Palm Pixi, Palm Pre, webOS, Palm App Catalog, HP TouchPad
- Parent: USRobotics (1995–1997); 3Com (1997–2000); Hewlett-Packard (2010–2011)

Palm, Inc., was an American company that specialized in manufacturing personal digital assistants (PDAs) and developing software. Palm designed the PalmPilot, the first PDA successfully marketed worldwide, and was known for the Treo 600, one of the earlier successful smartphones. Palm developed the Palm OS software for PDAs and smartphones released under its line of Palm-branded devices and also licensed to other PDA manufacturers.

The company was also responsible for the first versions of webOS, the first multitasking operating system for smartphones, and enyo.js, a framework for HTML5 apps. In July 2010, Palm was purchased by Hewlett-Packard (HP), and in 2011 announced a new range of webOS products. However, after poor sales, HP CEO Léo Apotheker announced in August 2011 that it would end production and support of Palm and webOS devices, marking the end of the Palm brand after 19 years. In October 2014, HP sold the Palm trademark to a shelf corporation tied to the Chinese electronics firm TCL Corporation.

== History ==
Palm, headquartered in Sunnyvale, California, was responsible for numerous products including the Pre and Pixi as well as the Treo and Centro smartphones. Previous product lines include the Pilot 1000, Palm Pilot Pro, Palm III, Palm V, Palm VII, Zire and Tungsten. While their older devices run Palm OS Garnet, four editions of the Treo run Windows Mobile.

=== Founding and acquisition ===
Palm Computing, Inc., was founded in 1992 by Jeff Hawkins, who later hired Donna Dubinsky and Ed Colligan, all of whom guided Palm to the invention of Palm Pilot. The company was started to write software for the Zoomer, a consumer PDA manufactured by Casio for Tandy. The Zoomer devices were also distributed by Casio and GRiD, while Palm provided the PIM software. The PEN/GEOS operating system was provided by Geoworks.

The Zoomer failed commercially, but Palm continued generating revenue by selling synchronization software for HP devices, and the Graffiti handwriting recognition software for the Apple Newton MessagePad.

The company was acquired by USRobotics in 1995. In June 1997, USRobotics was acquired by 3Com and Palm became a 3Com subsidiary. In June 1998, the founders became unhappy with the direction in which 3Com was taking the company, and left to found Handspring.

=== Stock offering and split into PalmSource and PalmOne ===
Palm logo, 2000–2004

PalmOne logo, stylized as "pa1mOne", 2003–2005

3Com made the Palm subsidiary an independent, publicly traded company on 1 March 2000, and it traded on the NASDAQ under the ticker symbol PALM. Palm Inc had its IPO during the dot-com bubble and in its first day of trading the shares of the new company hit an all-time high of US$95.06. But competition and the end of the tech bubble caused Palm's shares to lose 90% of their value in just over a year. By June 2001 the company's shares were trading at US$6.50, making it the worst performing PDA manufacturer on the NASDAQ index at the time.

In January 2002, Palm set up a wholly owned subsidiary to develop and license Palm OS, which was named PalmSource in February. PalmSource was then spun off from Palm as an independent company. In October 2003, the hardware division of the company merged with Handspring, was renamed to palmOne, Inc. and traded under the ticker symbol PLMO. The Palm trademark was held by a jointly owned holding company.

=== United as a single company ===
Palm logo, 2005–2010

In May 2005, palmOne purchased PalmSource's share in the 'Palm' trademark for US$30 million. In July 2005, palmOne launched its new name and brand, reverting to Palm, Inc. and trading under the ticker symbol PALM once again.

In late 2005, ACCESS, which specializes in mobile and embedded web browser technologies, acquired PalmSource for US$324 million.

On 4 January 2006, Palm released the Palm Treo 700w, the first Windows Mobile-powered Treo, in a partnership with Verizon Wireless and Microsoft.

In December 2006, Palm, Inc. paid US$44 million to ACCESS for an irrevocable license to use and modify the source code for Palm OS Garnet as well as ship Palm OS Garnet in any Palm product without paying royalties; with this arrangement, the Palm company could once again develop both its hardware and software.

In June 2007, Palm formed a strategic relationship with the private-equity firm Elevation Partners, who purchased a 25% equity stake of the company for US$325 million – an investment that came after months of rumours about a possible Palm sale. Palm CEO Ed Colligan acknowledged, "We were approached by larger parties over the last six months," and "the reality is that we thought this was the best outcome for our business and our investors."

On 18 December 2008, Palm CEO Ed Colligan announced that the company would no longer develop any new handheld PDAs. Palm announced the webOS operating system and Palm Pre smartphone at the Consumer Electronics Show on 8 January 2009, and released on 6 June 2009 with Sprint. The design team was led by Matias Duarte, Mike Bell, Peter Skillman and Michael Abbott.

In early 2009, the hype over WebOS sent Palm's stock from US$3 to a high of about US$18. While reviews of the Palm Pre were positive, launching with only one U.S. carrier (Sprint, which was also a distant third in the market) proved to be a crucial mistake that limited sales, even though it became Sprint's phone. The Pre was often described as Palm's swan song as it was too late to keep the company – with only $250 million in cash and short-term investments at the beginning of 2009 – independent for long. By 2010 the share price of Palm dropped to below US$4.

=== Acquisition by HP and demise ===
Palm, Inc. logo, 2010

On 28 April 2010, Hewlett-Packard announced it would purchase Palm at $5.70 a share for $1.2 billion in an all-cash deal. The acquisition was completed on 1 July 2010.

The Palm global business unit was assigned responsibility for webOS software development and webOS-based hardware products, including smartphones, slate PCs, and netbooks.

In February 2011, HP unveiled a new line of WebOS products, including the Pre 3, Veer, and TouchPad; however, these products were branded under HP's name and not with the Palm name. In July 2011, as part of a reorganization, WebOS head Jon Rubinstein was demoted from senior vice president to a "product innovation role", and replaced by Stephen DeWitt, head of HP's North American consumer PC unit. At the same time, Palm was renamed the "webOS global business unit", effectively ending the use of the Palm brand.

The launch of the TouchPad was met with extremely poor sales; on 18 August 2011, HP announced that it would immediately end the production and support of all Palm and WebOS devices, and would be "exploring options to optimize the value of webOS software going forward", including a potential sale of the division to another company. HP also cancelled the U.S. release for the Pre 3 and Veer, and held a fire sale on remaining TouchPad stock, lowering prices for the tablet to as low as US$99 (leading to a major spike in demand for the device). The decision, made by HP's CEO at the time Léo Apotheker, along with its $11.7 billion acquisition of Autonomy, and threats to spin off HP's consumer business, led to a major decline in HP's market performance, with its shares falling in value by 45.4%.

Logo for HP subsidiary Gram, 2012–2013

Following Apotheker's resignation and his replacement by Meg Whitman, it was announced in December 2011 that an open source version of much of WebOS would be created. Shortly afterward, Jon Rubinstein, along with a number of other senior Palm staff members, began to leave HP. On 15 August 2012, it was revealed that HP had re-organized the remaining WebOS team as a unit known as "Gram", made up of the remaining components of Palm. In February 2013, HP announced that it had sold the WebOS team, along with a license to the WebOS source code, documentation, and underlying patents, to LG Electronics. LG planned to primarily use the WebOS platform for its smart TV products, rather than on mobile devices, but did not rule out the possibility.

=== TCL ownership, new device ===
On 30 December 2014, it was reported that in October 2014, HP had sold the Palm trademark and related intellectual properties to Wide Progress Global Limited, a shelf company controlled by Nicolas Zibell — a regional president of TCL Corporation, which markets Android smartphones under the Alcatel brand. At the same time, it was discovered that the former Palm.com redirected to a new site; the site displayed a "coming soon" page with the previous orange Palm logo, and the slogan "Smart move", which is also the slogan used by Alcatel OneTouch.

TCL publicly confirmed its acquisition of the Palm brand on 6 January 2015, stating that it planned to "re-create" the company with a new team based in Silicon Valley, and incorporate crowdsourcing into its product development.

On 15 October 2018, a new Palm companion device was unveiled, which is manufactured by a new Palm-branded startup company from California that is financially backed by TCL and basketball player Stephen Curry. It is an "ultra-mobile", Android-based device designed to serve as a smaller, simplified companion to a larger smartphone. The new device was announced as being exclusive to Verizon Wireless, only available as an add-on to an existing or new device plan.

== See also ==
- List of Palm OS devices
- Palm (PDA)
- Palm Desktop
- Palm Foleo
- PalmSource, Inc.
