= WebOS version history =

About the history of webOS

HP webOS logo (as of discontinuation)

webOS is a Linux operating system for smart devices, and formerly a mobile operating system. It was initially developed by Palm, which was later acquired by Hewlett-Packard, and then LG Electronics. Palm launched webOS in January 2009. Various versions of webOS have been featured on several devices, including Pre, Pixi, and Veer phones and the HP TouchPad tablet. The latest version, 3.0.5, was released on 12 January 2012.

== Palm / HP devices ==
webOS version	Release date	Notes
1.0.1	RTM	The 1.0.2 OTA update was already available on the first day of sale. Some Pre devices required this OTA update from 1.0.1 to 1.0.2 while others already had 1.0.2 pre-loaded.
1.0.2	5 June 2009	
1.0.3	19 June 2009	
1.0.4	29 June 2009	
1.1.0	23 July 2009	First release for Bell Canada
1.1.2	RTM for Palm Pre from O2	1.2 was already available in the United States when the O2 phones were released with 1.1.2. The 1.1.3 update was already available for European OTA update when the phones were available for sale.
1.1.3	13 October 2009	OTA update released only in Europe for GSM Palm Pre. Available on launch day. When released, 1.2 was already available in the United States.
1.2.0	28 September 2009	This was the first release said to support paid apps from the App Catalog.
1.2.1	2 October 2009 for Sprint, 6 October 2009 for Bell Canada	
1.2.9.1	Pixi RTM	This was a Pixi-only release. Version 1.3.1 was already available for OTA update when the Pixi was released
1.3.1	14 November 2009 for Sprint and Bell Canada 22 November 2009 for O2 Europe	For European carriers, this was the first OTA update following 1.1.3.
1.3.2	2 December 2009	This was a Pixi-only release
1.3.3	Not Released	Appears on the Palm Open Source Packages page as a release, but was never released on any known carrier.
1.3.5	28 December 2009	Only available on Sprint.
1.3.5.1	4 January 2010 for Sprint, 5 January for Bell Canada, 25 January for Verizon	Only released in North America
1.3.5.2	12 January 2010	Only released in Europe
1.3.8	Pre-Release	This appears to be a pre-release version used when testing the AT&T Pre and Pixi.
1.4.0	26 February 2010 for Sprint, O2, Movistar, 28 February 2010 for Verizon, 4 March 2010 for Bell Canada, 5 March 2010 for Telcel Mexico	This was the latest version for Telcel Pres for 2 years.
1.4.1	31 March 2010 in Europe, 1 April 2010 in Canada	Released only in Europe and Canada
1.4.1.1	31 March 2010 for Sprint, 29 April 2010 for Verizon	Released only in the United States
1.4.1.2	Pre-Release	Seen on a reviewer pre-production Vodafone Pixi Plus phone, presumed to be functionally equivalent to 1.4.1.1.
1.4.1.3	RTM for O2 Pixi Plus	Released only on the O2 Pixi Plus, supposed to be functionally equivalent to 1.4.1.1.
1.4.2	RTM for AT&T Pre Plus	Only on the AT&T Pre Plus, supposed to be functionally equivalent to 1.4.1.1.
1.4.3	RTM for AT&T Pixi Plus	Only on the AT&T Pixi Plus, supposed to be functionally equivalent to 1.4.1.1.
1.4.5	14 July 2010	The update was made available for different devices over several months starting 2010 July with the last device to receive this update, the Telcel Pre, receiving it in 2012 March. Some carriers never deployed this update. This is the final update for Pre and Pixi, and so far Pixi Plus phones, with some carriers releasing further updates for the Pre Plus and others not.
1.4.5.1	9 May 2011	Some bug fixes but has no new features. . Current for Pre, Pre Plus, Pixi, and Pixi Plus.
2.0.0	22 October 2010	This is an RTM release for the Pre 2. Many WebOS phones used by consumers currently still use 1.4.0 or 1.4.5 and may be left on those versions indefinitely.
2.0.1	19 November 2010	This is an RTM release, for Pre 2 phones or unlocked devices.
2.1.0	8 March 2011	Available on the Pre 2 through an OTA update and the Pre Plus for O2 Germany and Vodafone Europe through a USB-tethered "doctor" update. Current for North American Verizon Pre 2.
2.1.1	2 July 2011	This is an RTM release for the HP Veer O2 (EU). Current for EU Veer.
2.1.2	15 May 2011	This is an RTM release for the HP Veer AT&T (US). Current for North American Veer.
2.2	17 August 2011	This is an RTM release for the HP Pre 3.
2.2.3	28 September 2011	This is an OTA release for the HP Pre 3.
2.2.4	9 December 2011	This is an OTA release for some Palm Pre 2 models and the HP Pre 3. Additions for the Pre 2 include Skype, Data-At-Rest-Encryption, and non-Touchstone TouchPad sharing. Current for Unlocked Palm Pre 2, and all regions for Pre 3.
3.0	1 July 2011	Initial version of WebOS for HP TouchPad.
3.0.2	1 August 2011	Update for the HP TouchPad.
3.0.4	18 October 2011	Update for the HP TouchPad. Ability to pair non-WebOS phones with the HP TouchPad. New Camera app for photos and videos. Support for playing Ogg Vorbis and FLAC lossless music files.
3.0.5	12 January 2012	The last update for the TouchPad. It enhanced core apps like Email, Keyboard and Calendar, improves the video calling experience, and fixes additional bugs. Added support for HTTP Live Streaming. Added issue of "Not enough space to download", that is fixed by deleting file /var/luna/data/downloaddata.db. Current for TouchPad.
4.0	Canceled	Codenamed 'Eel'. Originally planned for HP's cancelled 'Sapphire' and 'Twain' tablets, webOS 4.0 included a major redesign of the user interface. Development briefly continued after HP ceased development of webOS hardware, but was later canceled.

== webOS OSE ==
Version	Release date	Reference
1.1.0	29 June 2018	
1.2.0	30 August 2018	
1.3.0	20 September 2018	
1.4.0	31 October 2018	
1.4.1	3 December 2018	
1.5.0	10 January 2019	
1.6.0	14 March 2019	
1.7.0	16 April 2019	
1.8.0	17 June 2019	
1.10.0	30 July 2019	
2.0.0	29 October 2019	
2.1.0	20 November 2019	
2.2.0	23 December 2019	
2.3.0	23 January 2020	
2.4.0	18 March 2020	
2.5.0	12 May 2020	
2.6.0	20 July 2020	
2.7.0	29 September 2020	
2.8.0	13 November 2020	
2.9.0	22 January 2021	
2.10.0	2 April 2021	
2.11.0	25 June 2021	
2.12.0	16 July 2021	
2.13.0	6 August 2021	
2.13.1	10 September 2021	
2.13.2	22 October 2021	
2.14.0	30 November 2021	
2.14.1	24 December 2021	
2.15.0	18 February 2022	
2.16.0	11 May 2022	
2.17.0	1 July 2022	
2.18.0	2 September 2022	
2.19.0	2 December 2022	
2.19.1	29 December 2022	
2.20.0	17 February 2023	
2.20.1	15 March 2023	
2.21.0	27 April 2023	
2.22.0	21 June 2023	
2.23.0	7 September 2023	
2.24.0	8 November 2023	
2.25.0	17 January 2024	
2.26.0	5 June 2024	
2.27.0	5 November 2024	
2.28.0	27 March 2025	
