= List of WebOS devices =

This is a list of devices that run WebOS.

== LG ==
- LG Watch Urbane LTE, 2015 (LG used Android Wear on its other watches)
- All LG televisions released in 2015 onward, and some 2014 televisions

== HP ==
- HP Veer
- HP Pre^{3}
- HP TouchPad

== Palm ==
- Palm Pre
- Palm Pixi
- Palm Pre Plus
- Palm Pixi Plus
- Palm Press

== Hyundai ==
- Some Hyundai televisions use WebOS, including the HYLED6003W4KM
