= Jon Rubinstein =

American electrical engineer (born 1956)

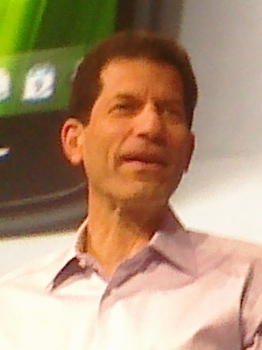
- Rubinstein in 2011
- Born: October 1956 (age 70); New York City, New York
- Education: Cornell University; Colorado State University
- Known for: Playing key role in development of Apple's iPod and iMac, and webOS
- Spouse: Karen Richardson

Jonathan J. Rubinstein (born October 1956) is an American electrical engineer who played a role in the development of the iMac and iPod, the portable music and video device first sold by Apple Computer Inc. in 2001. He left his position as senior vice president of Apple's iPod division on April 14, 2006.

In 2005, he was elected a member of the National Academy of Engineering for the design of innovative personal computers and consumer electronics that have defined and led new industries. He is also a senior member of the Institute of Electrical and Electronics Engineers.

== Early years and education ==
Rubinstein was born and raised in New York City. His mother was an academic who received a PhD from Rutgers University. He is a graduate of the Horace Mann School, class of 1975. He went to college and graduate school at Cornell University in Ithaca, N.Y., where he received a B.S. in electrical engineering in 1978 and a master's in the same field a year later. While at Cornell, Rubinstein was a member of the student-run radio station on campus, WVBR. He later earned a M.S. in computer science from Colorado State University in Fort Collins, Colorado.

Rubinstein's first jobs in the computer industry were in Ithaca, where he worked at a local computer retailer and also served as a design consultant to an area computer company.

== Career ==
After graduating school, Rubinstein took a job with Hewlett-Packard in Colorado. He spent about two years in the company's manufacturing engineering division, developing quality-control techniques and refining manufacturing processes. Later, Rubinstein worked on HP workstations.

Rubinstein left HP in 1986 to join a startup, Ardent Computer Corp., in Silicon Valley. While at Ardent, later renamed Stardent, he played an integral role in launching a pair of machines, the Titan Graphics Supercomputer and the Stardent 3000 Graphics Supercomputer.

In 1990, Apple co-founder Steve Jobs approached Rubinstein to run hardware engineering at his latest venture, NeXT. Rubinstein headed work on NeXT's RISC workstation – a graphics powerhouse that was never released because in 1993, the company abandoned its floundering hardware business in favor of a software-only approach.

After helping to dismantle NeXT's manufacturing operations, Rubinstein went on to start another company, Power House Systems. That company, later renamed Firepower Systems, was backed by Canon Inc. and used technology developed at NeXT. It developed and built high-end systems using the PowerPC chip. Motorola bought the business in 1996.

After Apple's purchase of NeXT, Rubinstein had planned on an extended vacation to travel. But Jobs, now an unpaid consultant for Apple, invited Rubinstein to work with him. At the time, Apple was losing industry support. Their reputation as an innovator was waning, and their profits were decreased.

Rubinstein joined Apple in February 1997, which came right after a year in which Apple lost US$816 million. He joined Apple anyway because, as he told The New York Times, "Apple was the last innovative high-volume computer maker in the world."

Rubinstein joined Apple as Senior Vice President of Hardware Engineering, and a member of its executive staff. He was responsible for hardware development, industrial design and low-level software development, and contributed heavily to Apple's technology roadmap and product strategy.

Rubinstein took on an immense workload upon his arrival. The company sold over 15 product lines, nearly all of which were derided as inferior to other computers available at the time. Internally, Apple also suffered from mismanagement of its hardware teams. Multiple teams often worked on the same product independently of each other, and very little attention was directed towards making all of the product lines fully compatible with each other. With Jobs, Rubinstein helped towards fixing both of these problems.

He also helped initiate an extensive cost-cutting plan affecting research projects and engineers. Expenses were eventually cut in half. After critically examining all projects currently in the pipeline, the G3, a fast PowerPC-based desktop machine, was chosen to be Apple's next released product. Upon its release at the end of 1997, Apple finally had what it hadn't had in years: a cutting-edge desktop machine that could compete with its Intel-based competitors.

In 1997, Jobs cancelled almost all of the product lines, and introduced a new product strategy focusing only on desktop and laptop computers for both consumer and professional customer. With the Power Macintosh G3 filling the role of a desktop computer marketed at professional customers, Apple began to focus on an entry-level desktop computer suitable for consumers. The result was the iMac released in 1998, a computer with an innovative design intended to be friendly and easily accessible for average computer users. For the iMac's development, Rubinstein assembled a team and with a deadline of only 11 months (a timeline they considered impossible). The iMac was an immediate success, not only helping to revitalise Apple as a company, but also popularising new technologies at the time, such as USB, which would then go on to become an industry standard. The iMac also shipped without a floppy disk drive (rare for computers of the era), relying solely on the optical drive and new technologies such as USB and Firewire for data transfer. Rubinstein was responsible for both of these decisions.

Future rollouts under Rubinstein's management included all subsequent upgrades (the G4 and G5) of the Power Mac series. While they were technically powerful computers, the Power Mac series suffered from the perception that they were slower than their Intel-based counterparts because their PowerPC CPUs listed slower clock speeds. Rubinstein and Apple popularised a term known as the Megahertz myth, to describe how the PowerPC architecture could not be compared to the Intel architecture simply on their clock speeds (the PowerPC CPUs, despite their lower clock speeds, were generally comparable to Intel CPUs of the era).

Due to the relatively low sales of its Mac computer brand, Apple decided to expand its ecosystem in order to increase its consumer awareness. The iPod came from Apple's "digital hub" category, when the company began creating software for the growing market of personal digital devices. Digital cameras, camcorders and organizers had well-established mainstream markets, but the company found existing digital music players "big and clunky or small and useless" with user interfaces that were "unbelievably awful", so Apple decided to develop its own. Even though it was a space with immense market potential, previous products had not enjoyed any notable market penetration.

By 2000, Steve Jobs expressed interest in developing a portable music player. But Rubinstein demurred, saying the necessary components were not yet available. While on a routine supplier visit to Toshiba Corp. in February, 2001, however, Rubinstein first saw the tiny, 1.8-inch hard disk drive that became a critical component of the iPod. While Toshiba engineers had developed the drive, they were not sure how it could be used. At a Tokyo hotel later that evening, Rubinstein met with Jobs, who was in Japan on separate business. "I know how to do it now. All I need is a $10 million check," he told Jobs.

Jobs agreed, and Rubinstein assembled and managed a team of hardware and software engineers to ready the product on a rushed, eight-month schedule. The team's engineers needed to overcome a number of hurdles, including figuring out how to play music off a spinning hard drive for more than 10 hours without wiping out a battery charge. Rubinstein's production contacts proved invaluable, too; the iPod's sleek, minimalist design, with its high-gloss, engraveable metal back, was a mass-manufacturing triumph. The success of the first-generation iPod was almost overnight. By 2004 the business became so important to Apple that the iPod was spun off into its own division, which Rubinstein took over.

Other iPod models were released on a regular basis, increasing the device's capacity, decreasing its size, and adding features including color screens, photo display and video playback. By early 2008, more than 119 million iPods had been sold, making it not only the most successful portable media player on the market but one of the most popular consumer electronics products of all time.

Rubinstein - sometimes called the "Podfather" because of his role in developing the iPod - was also instrumental in creating a robust secondary market for accessories such as speakers, chargers, docking ports, backup batteries, and other add-ons. That gear, produced by a network of independent companies that came to be known as "The iPod Ecosystem", by 2006 generated more than $1 billion in annual sales. In the 2007 fiscal year, the iPod generated $8.3 billion in revenue, or about a third of Apple's sales.

By around the fall of 2005, Rubinstein had become upset by Tim Cook’s increasing leadership role as COO and his frequent clashes with SVP of Industrial Design, Jony Ive, who was very close with Jobs. Ive kept designing costly or difficult to engineer products, which Rubinstein balked at. Jobs told his biographer Walter Isaacson “In the end, Ruby’s from HP, and he never delved deep, he wasn’t aggressive.” Eventually, Ive told Jobs “It’s him, or me.”, and Jobs decided to keep Ive instead.

In October 2005, Apple announced that Rubinstein would be retiring on March 31, 2006, and he was succeeded as iPod chief by Tony Fadell. It was later announced that he would make himself available for up to 20% of his workweek on a consulting basis. It is said that with the approaching release of an upcoming hand-held device (which would become the iPhone), Steve Jobs started paying lesser attention to Rubinstein and more attention to young engineers. Rubinstein was given a promotion which actually reduced his power at Apple. Jobs's focus shifted to newer engineers which ultimately resulted in Rubinstein's departure.

In 2007, Rubinstein joined Palm as executive chairman of its board of directors; at about the same time, he stepped down as chairman of Immersion Corp., a developer of haptic technology. Rubinstein took control of Palm's product development and led its research, development, and engineering efforts. One of his first tasks included winnowing the company's product lines and restructuring R&D teams. He was instrumental in developing the webOS platform and the Palm Pre. Rubinstein debuted both on January 8, 2009, at the Consumer Electronics Show (CES) in Las Vegas. On June 10, 2009, just four days after the successful release of his brainchild, the Palm Pre, Rubinstein was named the CEO of Palm.

The Pre first launched on the Sprint network. Reports at the time of the launch noted that it was a record for Sprint, with 50,000 units sold its opening weekend. A follow-up phone, the Palm Pixi, was announced on September 8, 2009, and released on Sprint on November 15, 2009. Rubinstein had said that one of Palm's keys moving forward would be to "bring on more carriers and more regions," and the company launched its Palm Pre Plus and Pixi Plus phones on Verizon Wireless in January 2010. In the same month, AT&T announced plans to launch a pair of Palm's webOS devices later in 2010.

But the addition of Verizon Wireless did not help as much as expected. By February 2010, Palm warned that its products were not selling as quickly as hoped.

Rubinstein's visibility in the mainstream tech community grew upon joining Palm. He was the featured guest in September 2009 at the first episode of "The Engadget Show," a web videocast produced by the technology weblog. In December 2009, the magazine Fast Company named Rubinstein one of its Geeks of the Year, along with people such as Facebook founder Mark Zuckerberg and writer/director/producer J. J. Abrams; Fast Company also named Rubinstein to its list of the "100 most creative people in business."

Rubinstein rejoined HP in 2010, when the latter bought Palm for $1.2 billion. The deal gave HP another chance to enter the mobile-device market while sending a lifeline to Palm, which some analysts expected to run out of cash within two years. Rubinstein agreed to remain with the company for 12 to 24 months after the merger.

At the time, HP said it would utilize webOS across a spectrum of products, including phones, printers and other devices. HP's strategy was to keep consumers connected to all of their information through the cloud, regardless of which device they were on.

On July 1, 2011, HP released the webOS-based TouchPad. Shortly after, Rubinstein stepped down from the webOS unit and assumed a "product innovation role" elsewhere within HP. While Rubinstein had pledged to be patient in building demand for the device, HP abandoned it quickly in the face of soft sales: The TouchPad was on the market for only seven weeks when then-CEO Leo Apotheker announced in August that the company would discontinue all hardware devices running webOS. (HP subsequently slashed the price of the least expensive TouchPad to $99, setting off a buying frenzy and leading technology-research firm Canalys to call it the "must-have technology product of 2011.)

Apotheker himself was gone less than a month later, when the HP board replaced him with former eBay CEO Meg Whitman. She announced plans to make webOS open source in December 2011.

On January 27, 2012, Jon Rubinstein left HP after his 24 months contract ended. In an interview, he said he would not retire, but take a break – and while he had no plans at the time, he added "the future is mobile."

In May 2013, Rubinstein joined the board of Qualcomm, a leading provider of chips used in mobile devices. He also currently sits on the board of Amazon.com, to which he was elected in December 2010.

Rubinstein's appointment as co-CEO at Bridgewater Associates, the world's largest hedge fund, was announced in a letter to clients in March 2016. In the note, Bridgewater officials noted that "because technology is so important to us, we wanted one of our co-C.E.O.s to be very strong in that area." Rubinstein replaced Greg Jensen, who moved to concentrate on his role as co-chief investment officer. Less than one year later, it was announced that Rubinstein was leaving the company because he and Bridgewater founder Ray Dalio "mutually agree that he is not a cultural fit for Bridgewater".

== Personal life ==
Rubinstein is married to Karen Richardson, a technology-industry veteran who is currently on the board of BT Group plc.
