= Palm Pre 2 =

Mobile phone model

- Manufacturer: Palm, Inc.
- Predecessor: Palm Pre
- Successor: Pre 3
- Related: Palm Pixi; Palm Pre
- Form factor: Slider smartphone
- Dimensions: 100.7 mm (3.96 in) (h); 59.6 mm (2.35 in) (w); 16.9 mm (0.67 in) (d)
- Weight: 145 g (5.1 oz)
- Operating system: webOS
- CPU: Texas Instruments OMAP 3630 clocked at 1GHz (ARM Cortex-A8) + PowerVR SGX clocked at 430Mhz
- Memory: 512 MB 200MHz DDR DRAM
- Storage: Flash memory 16 GB
- Battery: 3.7 V 1150 mAh "Palm BP1" Internal rechargeable removable lithium-ion battery
- Rear camera: 5.0 megapixel camera with LED flash, "extended depth of field", and geotagging
- Display: 320 × 480 px, 3.1 in (79 mm) HVGA, 24-bit color LCD
- Data inputs: Multi-touch touchscreen display, volume controls, proximity and ambient light sensors, 3-axis accelerometer

The Palm Pre 2 /ˈpriː/, styled as palm prē 2, is a slider smartphone designed and marketed by Palm, Inc., and Hewlett-Packard with a multi-touch screen and a physical sliding keyboard. The smartphone is the third to use Palm's Linux-based mobile operating system, webOS (releasing with version 2.0). The Pre 2 functions as a camera phone, a portable media player, and has location and navigation capabilities. The Pre also serves as a personal information manager, has a number of communication and collaboration applications, and has Bluetooth and Wi-Fi connectivity built-in.

The Palm Pre 2 was announced on October 19, 2010, with an initial launch date of October 22, 2010, on French carrier SFR. It was also announced that the Pre 2 would be coming to United States carrier Verizon Wireless, Rogers Wireless in Canada, and also as an unlocked UMTS developer phone.

Additions include a flat Gorilla Glass screen (instead of the curved plastic of its predecessors) surrounded with plastic trim, a faster processor, an upgraded camera. The plastic door which covered the microUSB port on previous iterations, considered flimsy by some, was removed. Otherwise, the Pre 2 has the same size and design as its predecessors.

The Pre 2 was the last mobile phone to be branded with the Palm name. The Pre 3, Veer and Touchpad were branded as HP devices.

== History ==
On August 11, 2010, webOS developer Geoff Gauchet discovered that an unknown device with the code name "Roadrunner" was accessing his Foursquare app using a new version of webOS, version 2.0.

On October 12, 2010, several specifications of Pre 2, including processor speed and memory, were leaked on France's SFR website, prior to its official launch on October 22.

On November 18, 2010, the Pre 2 became available in the U.S. as an unlocked developer device.

On December 20, 2010, the Pre 2 launched in Canada on Rogers Wireless.

On February 17, 2011, the Pre 2 launched in the U.S. on Verizon Wireless.

== Software ==
The Pre 2 is the first phone to use version 2.0 of HP Palm's webOS. The last version to be available for the Pre 2 was version 2.2.4, subject to carrier approval on certain models however.
