= NetCast =

Smart TV firmware

- Developer: LG
- Operating system: Linux
- Included with: Smart TVs
- Successor: WebOS
- Website: webostv.developer.lg.com at the Wayback Machine (archived 2021-06-17)

NetCast (later Smart TV, then Legacy Platform) is a discontinued Smart TV platform based on Linux, built by LG Electronics that was preinstalled on their smart TVs between 2009 and 2014. LG has signed partnerships with various companies to provide services on the TV. It includes YouTube, AccuWeather, Orange Mobile, Maxdome, CinemaNow, Netflix, Skype and more apps that can be downloaded from the internet. LG has combined local and global services to provide the most relevant content. In 2011, LG added the LG Apps Store to the platform. It allowed users to install applications which were not previously included on their TVs. The platform was succeeded by WebOS.

== History ==
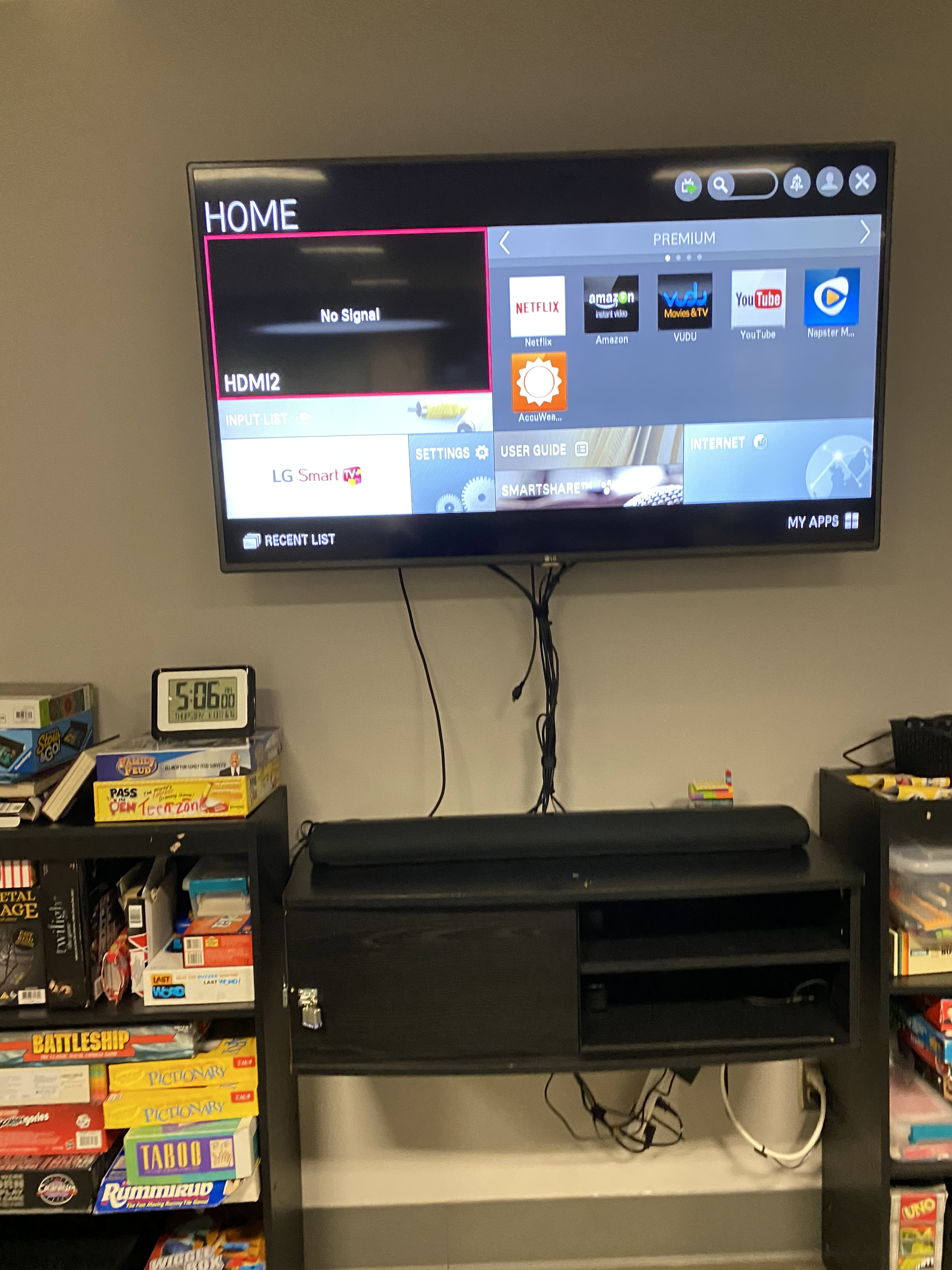
LG NetCast 2014 Home Page

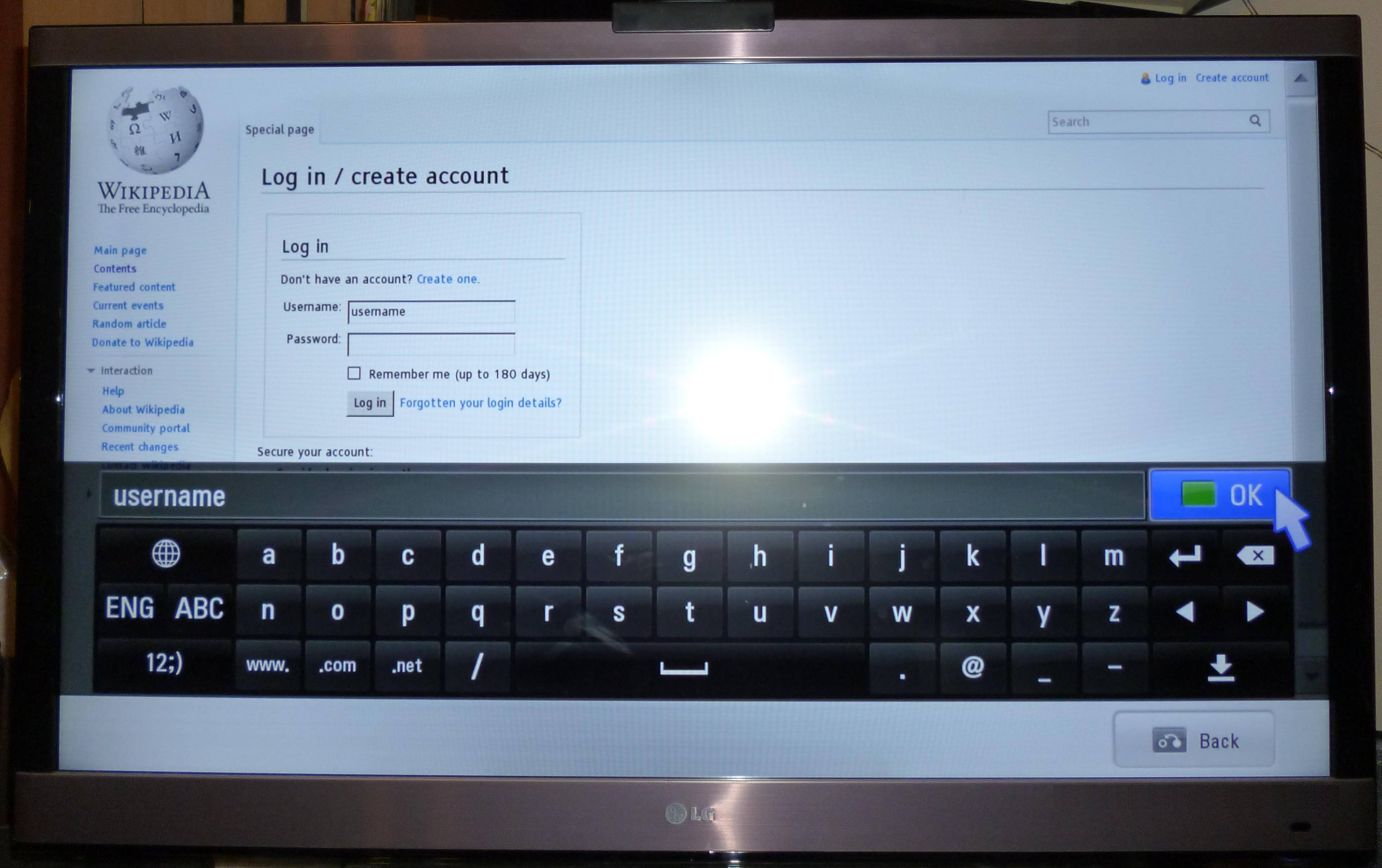
LG Smart TV running NetCast using the Web browser.

NetCast, or NetCast Entertainment Access, was announced by LG at CES 2009. At launch, it gave users access to Netflix, YouTube and Yahoo! Widgets. Later, support for Vudu has also been added.

In 2010, LG introduced the LG Magic Remote, which is a TV remote designed to be used with their Smart TV system. The motion-controlled remote allowed users to move it in the air to control a mouse cursor, similar to the Nintendo Wii. The technology for the remote was provided by Hillcrest Labs, and is still used today.

NetCast was rebranded to Smart TV in 2011, which was shown first at CES. In 2011, the company Marmalade Technologies added NetCast support to their Marmalade SDK.

TechRadar considered it "just plain disappointing" in a 2010 review. In a 2011 review, they noted that NetCast was first a mere placeholder with only three services, but noted that more apps had been added via a firmware update.

The OpenLGTV project has added homebrew widgets to the NetCast platform.

The software logged the filenames that were accessed and uploaded them to servers of LG.

NetCast and Smart TV were replaced by the WebOS platform in 2014. Starting in 2015, most smart TVs by LG were based on webOS.

== Apps ==
Apps were installed via either LG Apps Store (more history below), LG Developer Mode or homebrew.

LG App Store (also known as LG Apps, LG Smart World or Premium Service on some models, now called as LG Store) is the HTML store for downloading HTML/JS/CSS apps that enable services to access. The apps were rendered using Apple's WebKit browser engine. The home screen was also controlled by a WebKit app runtime which is a browser engine hosting web apps.

A few components were not HTML/JS/CSS which are DRM, video decoders, middle (for example, Flash-era video plugins early on), some closed source streaming clients (proprietary Sliverlight-like or vendor SDK modules) and low-level codecs or DRM modules

== See also ==
- Orsay (operating system) - the direct competitor to NetCast made by Samsung used in its Internet@TV and Smart TV lines from 2009 to 2014 before being replaced by Tizen in 2015
- Vewd - the competitor to Orsay made by Opera. Usually used in Devant and Hisense TVs until Devant and Hisense changed it to VIDAA in 2016
