= LuneOS =

Mobile operating system

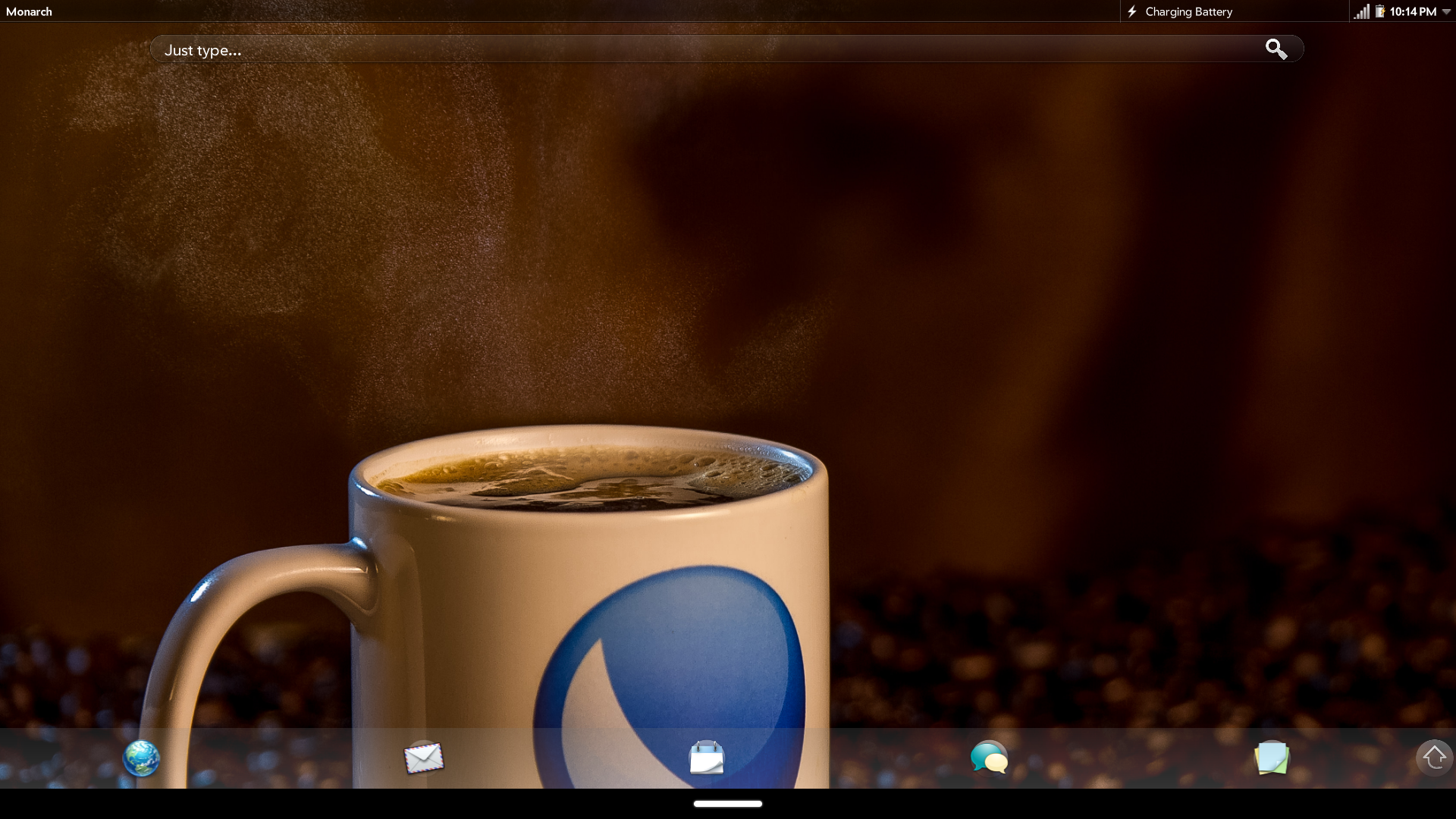
- LuneOS screenshot for the Eiskaffee release.
- Developer: webos-ports.org community
- Written in: C (core), C++, Qt 5.x (UI), QML (UI), Qt WebEngine (UI)
- OS family: Unix-like
- Working state: Current
- Source model: Open source
- Initial release: 1 September 2014
- Latest release: Eiskaffee / 15 February 2024; 2 years ago
- Marketing target: Smartphones; Tablet computers
- Available in: English
- Package manager: Preware to install/update/remove *.ipk files
- Supported platforms: 32-bit and 64-bit with ARMv5 and ARMv7 CPUs
- Kernel type: Monolithic (modified Linux kernel)
- Default user interface: Graphical (Multi-touch)
- License: Apache License 2.0; Modified Linux kernel under GNU GPL v2 Applications and recipes for Base OS are under MIT License
- Official website: www.webos-ports.org

LuneOS is a mobile operating system (OS) based on the Linux kernel and currently developed by the WebOS Ports community. LuneOS is designed primarily for touchscreen mobile devices such as smartphones and tablet computers.

LuneOS is the open-source successor for Palm/HP webOS where the user interface is rebuilt from scratch by using the latest technologies available (Qt 5.15.0 / QML, Qt WebEngine, etc). It is not intended to compete with iPhone or Android on features. All devices can have a LuneOS port if they have a CyanogenMod / LineageOS ROM available that works. LuneOS uses the minimal Android System Image that is created using Halium which in turn is based upon CyanogenMod / LineageOS.

Currently, the system is still in alpha, with some internal hardware not supported and some applications still buggy. It can be updated without a reinstall. It has the feel of the webOS formerly used on Palm and HP hardware, including a cards-based multitasking system and Universal Search. It has been described as "a niche mobile operating system maintained by enthusiasts".

== Release schedule ==
Codename	Release date	Notes
Affogato	1 Sep 2014	First LuneOS release for developers
Antoccino	2 Oct 2014	
Black Eye	1 Nov 2014	
Black Tie	6 Dec 2014	
Breve	9 Jan 2015	
Americano	4 Feb 2015	
Café au lait	13 Apr 2015	
Café Bombón	10 May 2015	
Café Cubano	6 Jun 2015	
Caffè Crema	17 Aug 2015	
Café de Olla	7 Sep 2015	
Caffé Latte	6 Oct 2015	
Caffè Marocchino	10 Dec 2015	First release with Qt WebEngine
Caffè Medici	13 Jan 2016	
Café Miel	7 Feb 2016	First release that supports calling
Coffee Milk	3 Mar 2016	
Café Mocha	13 May 2016	
Caffè Tobio	16 Jun 2016	
Café Touba	9 Aug 2016	
Cafe Zorro	15 Sep 2016	
Cà phê sữa đá	13 Oct 2016	
Cappuccino	25 Dec 2016	
Chai Latte	22 Feb 2017	
Cold Brew	30 Apr 2017	
Cortado	23 Jul 2017	
Decaf	8 Oct 2017	
Doppio	28 Nov 2018	
Eggnog Latte	24 Oct 2019	
Eiskaffee	15 Feb 2024	

== See also ==
- Enyo
- Access Linux Platform
- Ubuntu Touch - Linux Ubuntu for smartphones and tablets.
