= HP TouchPad =

Tablet computer

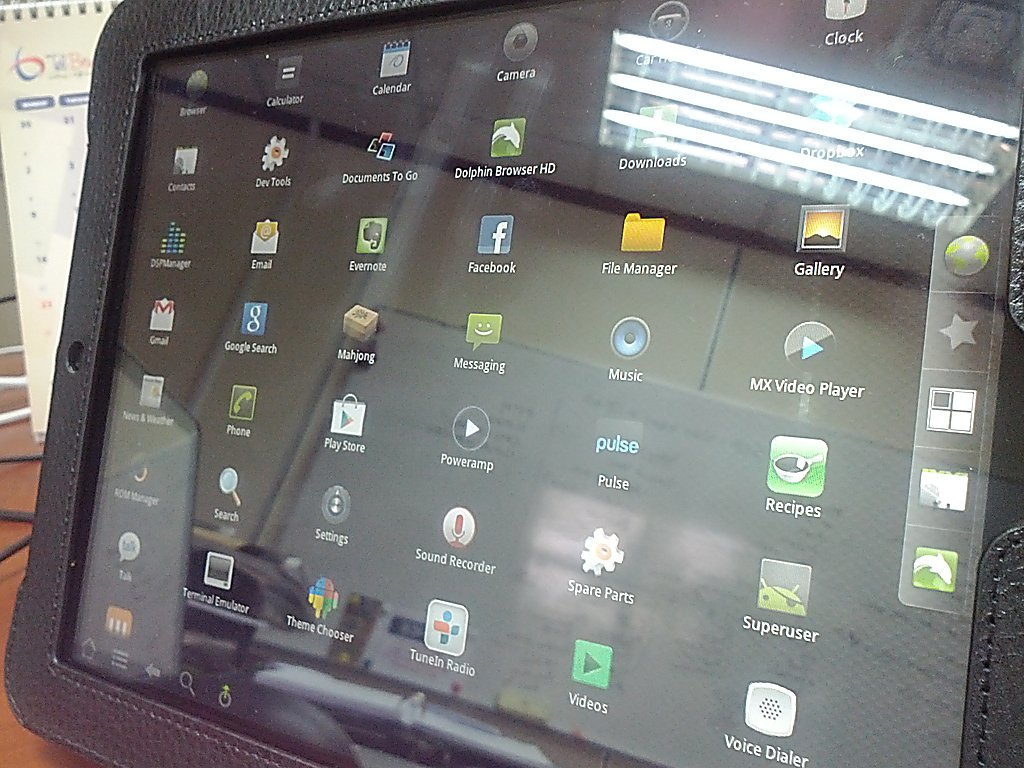
- Android 2.3 “Gingerbread” on the TouchPad
- Developer: Hewlett-Packard
- Type: Tablet computer
- Released: July 1, 2011 (US), July 15, 2011 (Canada, France, Germany, and UK), August 15, 2011 (Australia)
- Introductory price: US$499.99 (16 GB), US$599.99 (32 GB), US$599.99 (64 GB)
- Discontinued: August 18, 2011
- Operating system: webOS 3.0 to 3.0.5; Android 2.3 to 9.0 (unofficial); Ubuntu (unofficial)
- CPU: 1.2 GHz (black model), 1.5 GHz (white model), Qualcomm Snapdragon S3 APQ8060, dual-core ARM-based Scorpion
- Memory: 1 GB, Mobile DDR2 SDRAM
- Storage: 16 or 32 GB (black model), 64 GB (white model), flash memory
- Display: 9.7 in (25 cm), 1024×768 px XGA (132 PPI), 18-bit color, TFT LCD with IPS, LED-backlit
- Graphics: Qualcomm Adreno 220 core
- Sound: Internal stereo speakers with Beats Audio, 3.5 mm stereo jack for headset / headphone / microphone, vibration motor
- Input: Capacitive Multi-touch screen, 4 resizable virtual keyboards, power / volume / center buttons, microphone, ambient light sensor, Accelerometer, Gyroscope, Magnetometer (compass)
- Camera: 1.3 MP HD front-facing
- Connectivity: Atheros AR6003 chip Wi-Fi (802.11 a/b/g/n), Bluetooth 2.1 + EDR with A2DP stereo, Hi-Speed microUSB
- Power: Rechargeable, 3.7 V, 6000 mAh, 22.2 W⋅h (80 kJ), lithium-ion polymer battery,
- Dimensions: 240 mm (9.4 in) (w); 190 mm (7.5 in) (h); 13.7 mm (0.54 in) (d)
- Weight: 740 g (26 oz)
- Successor: HP Slate 7
- Related: Palm Pre, Tablet computer
- Website: www.hp.com/united-states/webos/us/en/tablet/touchpad.html

The HP TouchPad is a tablet computer that was developed and designed by Hewlett-Packard. The HP TouchPad was launched on July 1, 2011, in the United States; July 15 in Canada, United Kingdom, France, Germany; and August 15 in Australia.

On August 18, 2011, 49 days after the TouchPad was launched in the United States, HP announced that it would discontinue all current devices running webOS. Remaining TouchPad stock received substantial price reductions, and quickly sold out.

== History ==
The HP TouchPad was announced on February 9, 2011, at the webOS "Think Beyond" event held at the Fort Mason Center in San Francisco alongside the HP Veer and HP Pre 3.

Initial sales of the device sold 25,000 of 270,000 units, and did not meet HP's expectations, rapidly becoming overshadowed by the launch of the iPad 2 in March. On August 16, 2011, it was reported that Best Buy refused to pay HP for any more TouchPad stock. In Europe, the TouchPad was estimated to have sold 12,000 in its first month of release. In Australia, Harvey Norman who was the exclusive retailer sold about 1,200 units in the four days it was on sale. Industry commentators suggested that the lack of apps for the platform and lackluster advertising was hindering sales. On August 18, HP announced that it would discontinue all webOS devices. HP CTO Shane Robison noted that the TouchPad "was half a generation or a generation behind the iPad and so that wasn't going to drive volume." Some years later, a member of the development team described the device as being made from "cast-off reject iPad parts."

On August 19, 2011, HP announced a substantial price drop on the TouchPad. In Canada and the USA, the price was $99 for the 16 GB model and $149 for the 32 GB model and quickly sold out. Large numbers of buyers acquired the TouchPad at these "firesale" prices. Most brick-and-mortar retailers reportedly sold out their entire inventories within hours the morning of August 20. Online retailers, including Barnes & Noble, Amazon.com, and Best Buy, took orders on August 22 that rapidly exceeded their inventory, and were forced to cancel many orders. A similar sale was held in Australian Harvey Norman stores, with several stores selling out their inventory within an hour. Similar sales took place in the UK with several stores reducing prices (£89 for the 16 GB and £115 for the 32 GB), and the HP TouchPad became the tablet with the highest approval rating. HP TouchPad stock immediately sold out domestically and overseas from consumers rushing to take advantage of the price promotion.

Following this successful sale, and to clear out their component suppliers' inventories of touch panels, batteries, and chassis, HP announced on August 30 that it would make another production run of the TouchPad. These units were used to fulfill existing orders to businesses like Tiger Direct and Best Buy, in bundles with a set price of $249.99 and $299.99.

Following Meg Whitman's appointment as CEO of HP, in conjunction with an announcement of the company's plans to continue developing webOS as an open-source operating system, she said that the company would continue using the OS in devices, specifically resuming its use in tablets. She said this would not happen in 2012, but would probably take place in 2013. In February 2013, HP sold the source code and transferred the remaining webOS team to LG, effectively ending the webOS' deployment in tablets and consumer products.

== Hardware ==
The HP TouchPad is a touchscreen tablet that runs HP webOS. It has several notable features. The TouchPad uses card multitasking found in Palm Pre phones. The integrated webcam on the front of the HP TouchPad enables video conferencing. There is a backlit Home button at the bottom. The HP TouchPad also allows for haptic feedback with vibration function. The hardware includes an ARM-based Qualcomm Snapdragon processor and 1 GB of RAM. "Touch to Share" allows a Pre 3 mobile to share information such as websites by touching its sensors with the TouchPad's sensors. The TouchPad can receive calls and text messages forwarded from any phone using a Palm Profile. as well as make and receive calls via the Skype application. An independent site estimated that the 16 GB and the 32 GB HP TouchPads contained $296.15 and $318.15 of materials respectively with a cost to assemble of $10.

=== Screen, audio and input ===
The HP TouchPad has a 9.7 inch, 1024×768 pixel, Gorilla Glass multitouch capacitive touch screen. Interaction can be by finger or a capacitive stylus, available for separate purchase. The TouchPad's virtual keyboard can be configured to one of four preset sizes, and has a number row on top of the common QWERTY layout. The TouchPad also features an InvenSense 3-axis gyroscope.

The TouchPad has three separate physical buttons, a sleep/wake button on the top right, a home button at the bottom of the front that launches the card view or the app launcher and a set of volume rockers at the right of the device. Holding the power button and the home button together creates a screen snapshot. The TouchPad has stereo speakers that feature Beats Audio.

=== Connectivity ===
The Atheros AR6003 chipset supports dual band 2.4 GHz and 5 GHz Wi-Fi 802.11a/b/g/n and Bluetooth 2.1 + EDR with A2DP stereo Bluetooth. The tablet can share URLs, phone calls, and text messages with webOS phones via Bluetooth pairing. Pairing with non-webOS smartphones was enabled by a software update 3.0.4.

=== Power and battery ===
The TouchPad uses a rechargeable 6000 or 6300 mAh Lithium-ion polymer battery rated at 3,7 V (total 22,2 Wh). It can be charged via MicroUSB connector or optional wireless charging by Touchstone charger. When using the Touchstone, the TouchPad enters a mode called Exhibition Mode, which displays simple information such as a clock, schedule or media.

The battery life was estimated at nine hours by HP; in a review by Engadget, the battery lasted for about eight and a half hours.

=== Other models ===
In July 2011, HP announced their webOS hardware roadmap. This included the "HP TouchPad 4G", with a faster 1.5 GHz processor, 32 GB of flash memory, integrated A-GPS, and AT&T 3.5G HSPA+ wireless mobile broadband capabilities; demo models were displayed at a press show, but it was not released for sale, except to HP employees, where it later appeared on eBay and craigslist. In August, a white model with 64 GB of flash memory, a 1.5 GHz processor and Wi-Fi – but without 3.5G – was built in small quantities and shipped. A small number of "TouchPad Go" models (codenamed "Opal") with a 7-inch display, 32 GB of flash memory, a 1.5 GHz processor, and cellular capabilities were made, some of which sent to technology review websites. These smaller TouchPads, however, were not mass-produced, with the overall inspiration later carried on to the HP Slate 7.

== Software ==
=== Pre-installed applications ===
| Application Name | Description |
|---|---|
| Web | Web browser; uses WebKit layout engine. |
| Calendar | Calendar application capable of synchronizing Facebook, Google, Microsoft Exchange and Yahoo calendars and displaying their events in unified and user-configurable Day, Week, and Month Views. |
| Email | Default email client. |
| Messaging | Standard SMS and MMS application; built in hooks for AIM, Yahoo, Google Chat, and Skype. |
| App Catalog | Access the HP App Catalog. |
| Memos | Note taking application. |
| Quickoffice | Suite of office applications with that allows for the viewing and creation of spreadsheets, slideshow presentations and word processing documents. |
| Adobe Reader | PDF viewing software. |
| Maps | Default mapping application that searches for locations, gets directions and displays traffic patterns. |
| Contacts | Address book where a user can store contact information that can be synced across your various accounts. |
| Music | Application that plays the music files stored on the device. |
| Phone & Video Calls | Standard phone dialer; can place phone calls and also use Skype for video calls. |
| Photos & Videos | View videos and photographs on the device. |
| Amazon Kindle (Beta) | Access to e-books on an Amazon account. |
| Facebook | Access Facebook via the user's account. |
| YouTube | Browse through videos on YouTube. |

== Operating systems ==
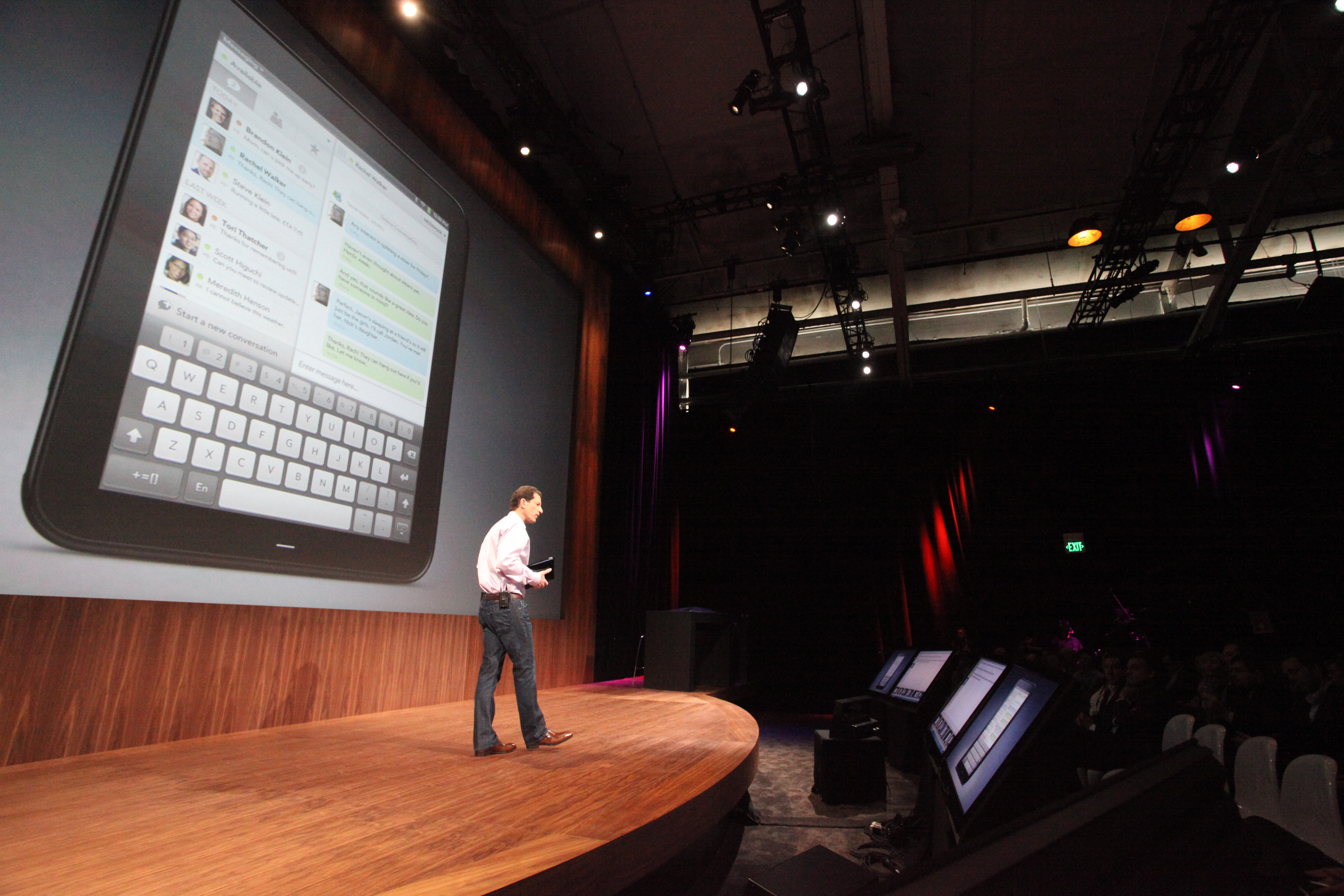
Jon Rubinstein introduces new HP TouchPad at a HP event in February 2011.

=== webOS ===
The TouchPad was sold with the webOS operating system, which offers video chat, wireless printing (HP printers only), email integration, ebooks, Web browsing, document editing, and access to the "HP Catalog", where additional apps can be downloaded.

webOS was a "card-based" multitasking environment. Open applications can be arranged into "stacks." webOS unobtrusively notifies users of messages, emails, and calendar agenda items, appearing on the top right of the screen, rapidly reviewed by a swipe gesture. webOS 3.0 integrates Adobe Flash. The last updated version was 3.0.5 as of January 12, 2012.

HP supports funding of a new open source project. webOS's scalability and easy app development base attracts developers. Open Source webOS provides standardized Java development tools to build and port apps to webOS rapidly. Open webOS as released by HP will not directly work with the TouchPad due to proprietary code; HP, however, released an open source webOS Community Edition for use with the TouchPad.

=== Android ===
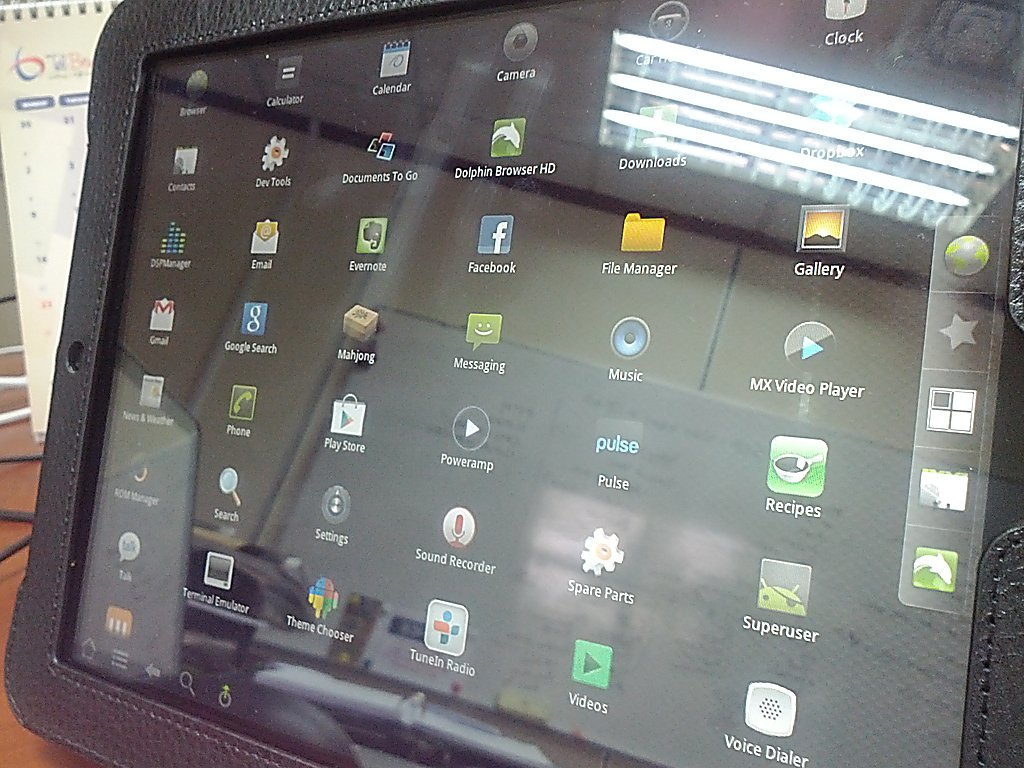
Android 2.3 on the TouchPad

On October 6, 2011, it was reported that a few customers had received new TouchPads with Android installed instead of webOS. HP later stated that they had developed a version of Android, for use in testing the hardware while webOS was still under development, suggesting that these units had been shipped with that software in error.

On October 22, 2011, Android 2.3 (Gingerbread) (in an Alpha version) became available for the TouchPad. This port, based on the CyanogenMod enhanced distribution of Android, allows the TouchPad to run most Android apps natively. The Android port for TouchPad did not replace webOS, providing a "multi-boot" so that TouchPad owners could start their tablets into Android, webOS, or other OSs. Android 3.0 'Honeycomb' was not ported to the TouchPad because the source code was not publicly available.

On January 7, 2012, a port of Android 4.0 (Ice Cream Sandwich) based on CyanogenMod 9 became available. It was a preliminary alpha build (Alpha 0) with some features including hardware-accelerated video playback, microphone and camera not functional at the time. It was updated to Alpha 0.5 around January 24, 2012 and then to Alpha 0.6 around January 30, 2012, bringing fixes and stability improvements.

In February 2012, HP released their source code for Android 2.3 for the HP TouchPad. The CyanogenMod Team received source code from HP and started working again on the TouchPad tablet port. PhoneNews.com reported, "The Android kernel was based on Qualcomm’s reference Android source code, and was used by HP internally to accelerate the release of the TouchPad. It was never intended for public use, but rather, to ensure that the TouchPad’s hardware would be ready for release to consumers alongside webOS 3. As webOS 3 was lagging behind the hardware in development, Android was also used in the manufacturing lines to test TouchPads before ultimately being flashed with webOS."

CyanogenMod 9 (CM9) based on Android 4.0.4 have official stable builds with all features working. There are also unofficial CM10, CM10.1, CM10.2 and CM11 based builds that have all features working. The CM11 builds' stability for daily use is dependent on the kernel used. Development of kernels based on Linux 3.0 and 3.4 are proceeding. ROM's based on the 3.4 kernel can be unstable and may have features missing. ROM's based on the 3.0 kernel are generally stable. Android 5.0 works for the TouchPad, although it is sluggish.

Android 7.0 (Nougat) was made available in September 2016, via Evervolv, an Android Open Source Project (AOSP) ROM authored by Flintman, and is nearly feature complete. It is usable and runs better than 5.1.

Android 7.1.1 (Nougat) was made available around December 2016, via Evervolv (authored by Flintman) as well as a second option by LineageOS (authored by Invisiblek).

Android 9.0 (Pie) was made available in April 2019, via Evervolv, an Android Open Source Project (AOSP) ROM.

=== Linux ===
Linux distributions compiled for the ARM architecture have been successfully run via chroot. Also, the X11 windowing system common to many Linux systems has been ported to run within webOS. This allows most graphical applications made for Linux to run in webOS.

A port of Ubuntu to run natively on the TouchPad was in development in January 2012, which boots via the moboot multiboot bootloader (using the same method as the Android port). The port was in an early alpha stage and is functional, but development ended after 2012.

In addition to Ubuntu, an alpha port of Arch Linux ARM, which in January 2012 provides full touchscreen support with GNOME 3 / LXDE, Wi-Fi access, but not Bluetooth, camera or sound can be installed using the previously mentioned moboot method.

=== LuneOS ===
LuneOS is a Linux-based operating system, designed specifically for native execution on touch devices.

== Optional accessories ==
=== Touchstone ===
The Touchstone is a wireless charging dock. While charging with the Touchstone, the TouchPad can be set to an Exhibition mode, allowing the user to choose to display photos in a digital photo frame, upcoming appointments, a clock, or other items (using third party extensions). The Touchstone also enables wireless communication between a HP Pre3 and a TouchPad. Tapping on a specific region will transfer web links to the Pre. This technology is known as “Touch to Share”.

The Touchstone has a USB power cable attached to it with a USB Standard-A plug on its end. It must be plugged into a high-power USB power adapter, such as the HP TouchPad power adapter or a newer high-current USB adapter. HP shows a warning in the user manual to not plug it into a laptop. In North America, the Touchstone ships with the same AC power adapter that is included with the TouchPad.

=== Keyboard ===
A Bluetooth wireless keyboard with typical QWERTY layout plus additional keys for special TouchPad capabilities. There is a power slide switch on the bottom. Two AA batteries are required.

It has special TouchPad keys for: Power, Card View, Cursor Left/Up/Right/Down, Volume +/-, Mute, Brightness +/-, Fast Forward, Play-Pause, Rewind, Show Virtual Keyboard, Show Just Type, Show Notifications. The keyboard will pair with other Bluetooth devices but some key functions may be missing as the keyboard layout (outside the alpha numeric keys) is specific to the TouchPad.

=== Power adapter ===
The power adapter converts wall AC to USB DC. This accessory contains the following items:

- Wall AC to USB power adapter, which has input specifications of 100–240 Volt 50–60 Hz 0.4 Amp AC, and output specifications of 5.3 Volt 2.0 Amp DC. It is cylindrical roughly the size of a "D" battery with a foldable 2-prong AC connector and a Standard-A USB socket.
- USB cable, 5 ft (150 cm), with a Standard-A plug and Micro-B plug on its two ends.

The TouchPad (adapter and cable) and Touchstone (adapter-only) ships with this accessory.

=== Case and sleeve ===
The protective case doubles as a stand for watching videos or typing. There are holes on the edges of the case for access to the microUSB connector, 3.5 mm jack connector, internal microphone. When it is folded open, there is an opening for the speaker along the "binding" edge. The case has a raised surface above the power and volume buttons, so they can easily be found. The TouchPad can charge while in the case using either the microUSB cable or Touchstone dock.

== Reception ==
Early reviews of the HP TouchPad were mixed. David Pogue of The New York Times wrote, "It works beautifully, and conveys far more information than the iPad 2. The tablet offers "real multitasking" with all open apps always running." Jason Chen of Gizmodo wrote, "After actually holding the TouchPad, I can say it's deceptively heavy. It's around the same weight as the iPad, but you'd think it would be lighter because the back was made of plastic. That said, it's not overly heavy, just heavier than you'd think by looking." Matt Buchanan, also writing for Gizmodo, praised the OS interface concept as 'good conceptually' but described the performance as "slow motion... give this thing six months. It could be amazing. If it's not by then, well, I guess that says everything that needs to be said." The Verge also noted poor performance, describing its interface as 'intuitive and natural' but 'sluggish, unfinished...a bit of a hard sell right now.'

Due to the firesale of the Touchpad, HP led all non-Apple tablets sold in US in 2011. By December 2011, HP's TouchPad was the second most desired tablet, with a 5 percent of share of tablet sales and an estimated 903,354 devices sold.

The HP Touchpad's firesale had an effect on future Android tablet sales and the low pricing scheme, as compared to iPad, was used with the Kindle Fire and Nexus 7, which were commercially successful Android tablets originally priced at $199.

== See also ==
- Comparison of tablet computers
- HP Slate
