= HP Pre 3 =

Early smartphone made by HP

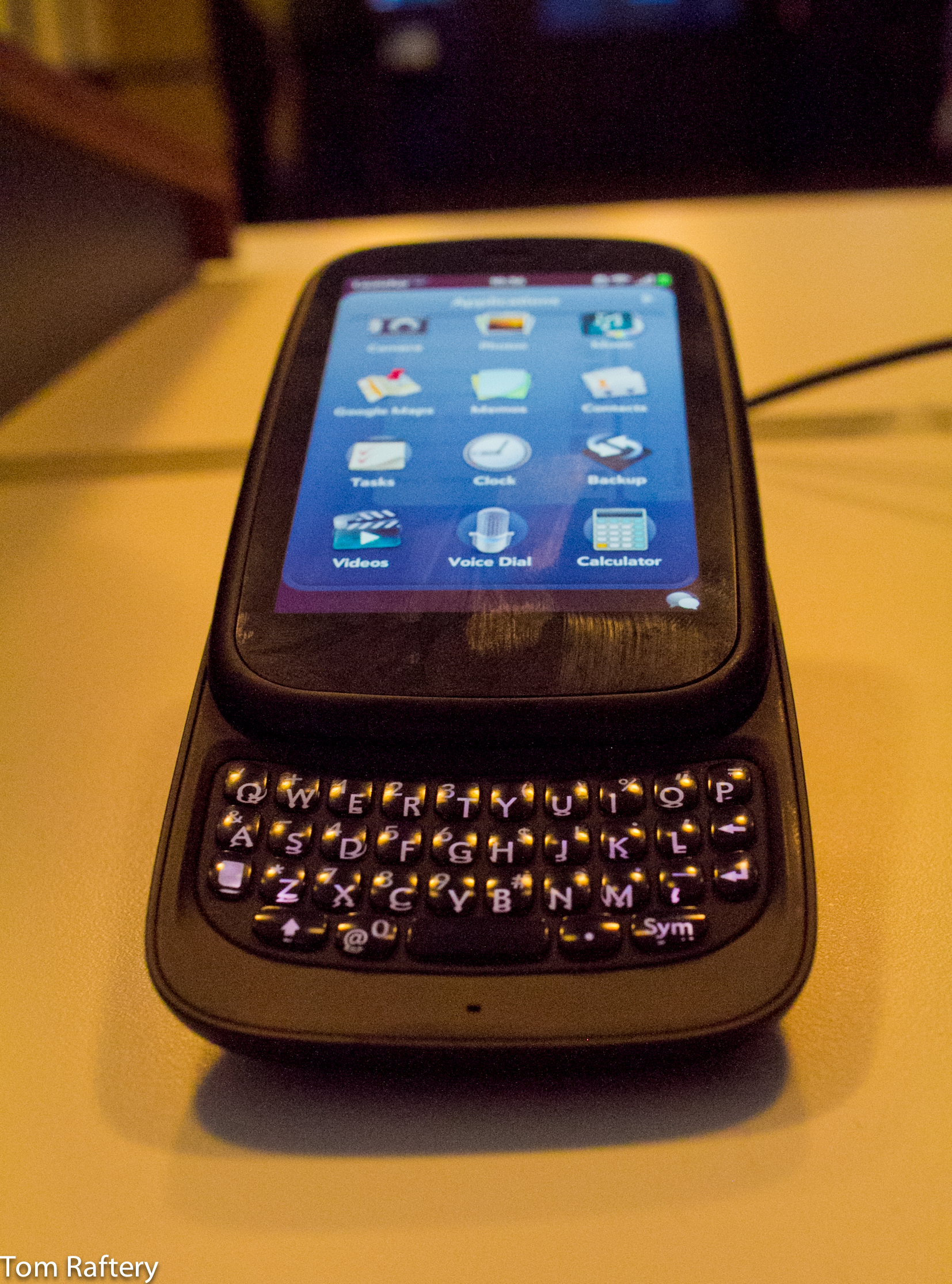
- Manufacturer: Hewlett-Packard
- Type: Touchscreen smartphone
- Series: Palm Pre
- Discontinued: August 18, 2011
- Predecessor: Palm Pre 2
- Related: Palm Pre; HP Veer; HP TouchPad
- Compatible networks: Quad band GSM networks: 850/900/1800/1900MHz; Tri band 3G UMTS networks: 900/1900/2100MHz
- Form factor: Slider
- Dimensions: 111 mm (4.4 in) (h); 64 mm (2.5 in) (w); 16 mm (0.63 in) (d)
- Weight: 155 g (5.5 oz)
- Operating system: HP webOS 2.2.4
- CPU: 1.4 GHz Qualcomm Snapdragon MSM8x55
- GPU: Adreno 205
- Memory: 512MB RAM
- Storage: 8GB or 16GB internal storage
- Rear camera: 5-megapixel auto-focus camera with LED flash, HD (up to 720p) video recording
- Front camera: VGA
- Display: 3.58-inch multitouch screen with a 24-bit color, 480x800 resolution WVGA display
- Sound: Mono speakerphone; dual-mic noise cancellation
- Connectivity: 802.11 a/b/g/n WiFi, Bluetooth 2.1, HSPA+, EvDo Rev. A
- Data inputs: Touchscreen, keyboard, and gesture area
- Website: www.palm.com

The HP Pre 3, styled as Pre^{3} /ˈpriː/, is a touchscreen slider smartphone manufactured by Hewlett-Packard. The device uses webOS, is powered by a Qualcomm Snapdragon processor, and has a 3.6-inch screen. It is conceptually the successor to the Palm Pre 2 and earlier Pre and Pre Plus models.

== History ==
The HP Pre 3 was announced on February 9, 2011, at the HP webOS "Think Beyond" event held at the Fort Mason Center in San Francisco alongside the Veer and TouchPad. It was commercially released in the United Kingdom on August 17, 2011.

The device supports a new Touch-to-Share proximity-based sharing feature, which allows compatible devices (such as the TouchPad) to instantly exchange data, media, and information via Bluetooth. The Pre 3 has 802.11 a/b/g/n Wi-Fi, 512 MB of RAM, 8 GB internal storage, Bluetooth v2.1, and a 1230 mAh battery. A 16 GB model was manufactured for AT&T and Verizon in the United States, neither model was ever released to the general public.

The Pre 3 was released on August 17, 2011, in the United Kingdom. The next day, August 18, HP announced that it would be discontinuing all webOS devices, including the Pre 3. The phone was never officially released in the United States, although models eventually were sold through the HP employee store in California, and many of those phones ended up on eBay auctions.

== Hardware ==
=== Screen and Input ===
The HP Pre 3 features a 3.58-inch multi-touch, capacitive touchscreen with a resolution of 800-by-480 pixels. The Pre 3 has three physical buttons for input, including the volume up/down buttons in the side, and the power button in the top. For navigating through the OS, the Pre 3 has a "gesture area", where you can swipe up to enter the card like multitasking view, swipe from right to left to go back in an application, swipe from left to right to go forward, or optionally swipe completely to the right or left to switch applications. Modifier keys combined with gestures enable text selection and cursor positioning, while command shortcuts are triggered by holding a tap in the gesture area while pressing a key on the keyboard.

=== Connectivity ===
The Pre 3 supports Bluetooth 2.1, 802.11a/b/g/n Wifi, and HSPA+, as well as GSM, EvDO, and CDMA (depending on the service provider). Along with the HP TouchPad, the Pre 3 supports a new technology called Touch to Share. Touch to Share lets you share URLs, phone calls, text messages, and data for 3rd party apps between the TouchPad and the HP Pre 3 by tapping the phone on the TouchPad's sensor. For example, a web site being browsed on the TouchPad can be transferred to the Pre's browser by tapping the two devices together.

UMTS frequency bands supported

Pre^{3} model	countries	UMTS frequency bands supported	model officially released?
AT&T Mobility	United States	850, 1900, 2100 MHz	no
Europe unlocked model	France, Germany, United Kingdom	900, 1900, 2100 MHz	yes
Verizon	United States	900, 2100 MHz	no

=== Audio and output ===
The Pre 3 has a mono loudspeaker, as well as dual mic noise cancellation.

=== Camera ===
The Pre 3 features a 5 mega pixel camera with auto focus, LED Flash, capable of 720p video recording. This phone also has a front-facing VGA camera for video calling with the integrated Skype application.

=== Availability ===
The Pre 3 was sold by the Carphone Warehouse in the UK on very competitive pay monthly contract terms only, and with very limited available stock. In the US, GSM models were sold direct to HP employees at $75 each, up to 12 per employee. They are AT&T branded, but unsupported by either AT&T or HP/Palm, though they have received an over-the-air (OTA) update (from 2.2.0 to 2.2.3). In addition, an update to webOS 2.2.4 was released for update by webOS Doctor and as an OTA update.

=== Pre-installed applications ===
Application Name	Description
Web	Web browser; uses WebKit layout engine.
Email	Default email client.
Messaging	Standard SMS and MMS application; built in hooks for AIM, Yahoo, Google Chat, and Skype.
App Catalog	Access to HP App Catalog.
Memos	Note taking application.
Quickoffice	Suite of office applications to view spreadsheets, slideshow presentations, and standard word processing documents.
PDF View	PDF viewing software.
Maps	Default mapping application to search for locations, get directions, and view traffic patterns.
Contacts	Standard address book.
Music	Plays the music files stored on the device.
Phone	Standard phone dialer that allows the user to place phone calls.
Photos	View photographs on the device.
Videos	View videos on the device.
Camera	Take photographs.
Calculator	Calculator application.
Clock	A standard clock/alarm application.
YouTube	Browse all of the videos on YouTube.
