= WebOS =

Linux kernel-based operating system developed by LG, previously Palm and HP

webOS

- Developer: LG Electronics, previously Hewlett-Packard & Palm
- Written in: C++ (Qt)
- OS family: Linux (Unix-like)
- Working state: Current
- Source model: Open source, source-available
- Latest release: LG TV: 25; Open-source: 2.28.0; HP TouchPad: 3.0.5; Palm Pre: 2.2.4
- Marketing target: Embedded devices
- Supported platforms: ARM
- Kernel type: Monolithic (Linux kernel)
- Default user interface: Graphical (Luna)
- License: Apache License, proprietary
- Preceded by: Palm OS (phones); NetCast (smart TVs)
- Official website: Open source website Developer website

webOS, also known as LG webOS, is a Linux kernel-based multitasking operating system for smart devices, such as smart TVs, that has also been used as a mobile operating system. It was initially developed by Palm, Inc. for its Palm smartphones. After Palm was acquired by Hewlett-Packard, HP made the platform open source, at which point it became Open webOS.

LG Electronics later acquired the operating system from HP, and subsequent releases targeted LG televisions, succeeding NetCast as LG's primary smart TV platform. In January 2014, Qualcomm announced that it had acquired technology patents from HP, which included all the webOS and Palm patents; LG licenses them to use in their devices.

Various versions of webOS have been featured on several devices since launching in 2009, including Pre, Pixi, and Veer smartphones, TouchPad tablet, LG's smart TVs since 2014, LG's smart refrigerators and smart projectors since 2017.

== History ==
=== 2009–2010: Launch by Palm ===
Palm launched webOS, then called Palm webOS, in January 2009 as the successor to Palm OS. At its January 2009 announcement, webOS was presented as a new platform for the Palm Pre, with features including Palm Synergy, application “cards” and global search. The first webOS device was the original Palm Pre, released by Sprint in June 2009. Early reviews of the Palm Pre in June 2009 highlighted webOS features such as multitasking, instant notifications, universal search and Synergy as defining parts of the device experience. The Palm Pixi followed.

=== 2010–2013: Acquisition by HP; the launch of Open webOS ===
In April 2010, HP acquired Palm. The acquisition of Palm was initiated while Mark Hurd was CEO, however he resigned shortly after the acquisition was completed. Later, webOS was described by new HP CEO Leo Apotheker as a key asset and motivation for the purchase. The $1.2 billion acquisition was finalized in June. HP indicated its intention to develop the webOS platform for use in multiple new products, including smartphones, tablets, and printers.

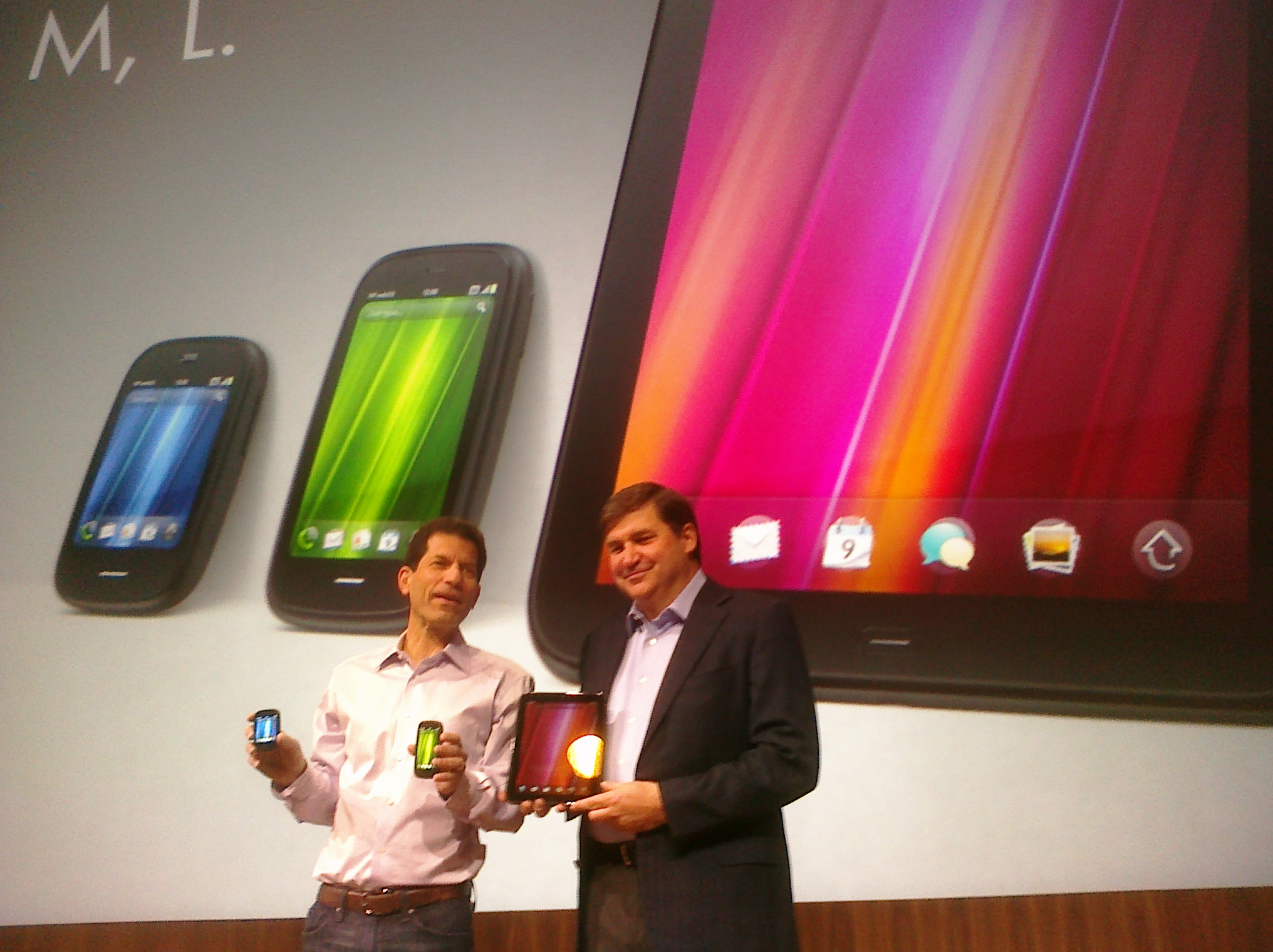
HP executives demonstrating webOS devices in 2011

In February 2011, HP announced that it would use webOS as the universal platform for all its devices. However, HP also made the decision that the Palm Pre, Palm Pixi, and the "Plus" revisions would not receive over-the-air updates to webOS 2.0, despite a previous commitment to an upgrade "in coming months." HP announced several webOS devices, including the HP Veer and HP Pre 3 smartphones, running webOS 2.2, and the HP TouchPad, a tablet computer released in July 2011 that runs webOS 3.0.

In March 2011, HP announced plans for a version of webOS by the end of 2011 to run within Windows, and to be installed on all HP desktop and notebook computers in 2012. Neither ever materialized, although work had begun on an x86 port around this time involving a team in Fort Collins, Colorado; work was scrapped later in the year.

In August 2011, HP announced that it was interested in selling its Personal Systems Group, responsible for all of its consumer PC products, including webOS, and that webOS device development and production lines would be halted. It remained unclear whether HP would consider licensing webOS software to other manufacturers. When HP reduced the price of the Touchpad to $99, the existing inventory quickly sold out.

The HP Pre 3 was launched in select areas of Europe, and US-based units were available only through unofficial channels (both AT&T and Verizon canceled their orders just prior to delivery after Apotheker's (HP's CEO at the time) announcement. Notably, these US Pre 3 units, having been released through unofficial channels, lacked both warranties and carried no support obligation from HP; as a result parts are nearly impossible to come by. HP announced that it would continue to issue updates for the HP Veer and HP TouchPad, but these updates have failed to materialize for the former, and the latter saw a final, unofficial release called "webOS CE" that contained only open-sourced components of webOS meant for what remained of the developer community rather than a conventional, user-centric update to the operating system. The last HP webOS version, 3.0.5, was released on January 12, 2012.

In December 2011, after abandoning the TouchPad and the proposed sale of the HP Personal Systems Group, HP announced it would release webOS source code in the near future under an open-source license. In August 2012, code specific to the existing devices was released as webOS Community Edition (CE), with support for the existing HP hardware. Open webOS includes open source libraries designed to target a wider range of hardware. HP renamed its webOS unit as "Gram".

In February 2012, HP released Isis, a new web browser for Open webOS.

==== Growth and decline of HP App Catalog ====
The HP App Catalog was an app store for apps for the mobile devices running webOS.

On June 6, 2009, webOS launched on the Palm Pre with 18 available apps. The number of apps grew to 30 by June 17, 2009, with 1 million cumulative downloads by June 27, 2009; 30 official and 31 unofficial apps by July 13, 2009; 1,000 official apps by January 1, 2010; 4,000 official apps September 29, 2010; and 10,002 official apps on December 9, 2011.

Subsequently, the number of available apps decreased because many apps were withdrawn from the App Catalog by their owners. Examples include the apps for The New York Times and Pandora Radio. After a Catalog splash screen on November 11, 2014, announcing its deprecation, the HP App Catalog servers were permanently shut down on March 15, 2015. The number of functional apps remaining at that time is unknown but was probably much lower due to the imminent abandonment of the project.

=== 2013–2018: Acquisition by LG; open-source edition launch ===
On February 25, 2013, HP announced that it was selling webOS to LG Electronics for use on its web-enabled smart TVs to succeed LG's NetCast platform. Under the agreement LG Electronics owns the documentation, source code, developers and all related websites. However, HP would still hold on to patents from Palm as well as cloud-based services such as the App Catalog. In 2014, HP sold its webOS patents to Qualcomm.

In January 2014, LG introduced its first webOS-based smart TVs at CES 2014. The television version adapted webOS from its earlier mobile-device use into a TV interface built around content sources, apps and input switching. The early interface included a home area for favorite apps and content sources, with navigation using LG's Magic Remote.

As well as its use as an OS for smart TVs, LG has expanded its use to various Internet of things devices. As a starting point, LG showcased a LG Wearable Platform OS (webOS) smartwatch in early 2015. At CES 2017, LG announced a smart refrigerator with webOS.

On March 19, 2018, LG announced an open-source edition of webOS. This edition would allow developers to download the source code for free as well as take advantage of related tools, guides, and forums on its new open source website to become more familiar with webOS and its inherent benefits as a smart device's platform. In the corresponding press release LG stated a desire that this will help its goal of advancing "its philosophy of open platform, open partnership and open connectivity".

=== 2019–present: webOS Auto, expansion of software ===
In April of 2020, LG announced that they would be expanding the webOS software to cars, known as webOS Auto. It first saw use in Kia and Hyundai SUV models, and has been used ever since, more recently in the Kia EV3.

On February 24th, 2021, LG announced that they would expand the webOS software to other TV manufacturers. Among the list of TV manufacturers were RCA, Konka, and Ayonz. In addition, webOS was also backed by technology partners such as Realtek, Nuance, and Universal Electronics.

In February 2021, LG expanded webOS licensing to other television manufacturers, positioning it as a smart TV platform used outside LG-branded televisions. Around 20 TV manufacturers, including RCA, Konka and Ayonz, were expected to release televisions using webOS.

The automotive context broadened in January 2023, when automakers increasingly presented gaming and video-related in-car entertainment features as part of a wider connected-vehicle strategy. These systems reflected interest in turning time spent inside vehicles into a source of digital services and recurring revenue.

Later that year, in November 2023, LG introduced webOS for Automotive to Hyundai Motor Group's Genesis models as part of an Automotive Content Platform based on webOS. The platform supports in-vehicle entertainment services, including YouTube, on supported infotainment screens.

For televisions, LG detailed the webOS Re program in 2024. The program provides four webOS version upgrades over five years for eligible models, extending the software support period of supported TVs beyond their original launch version.

In September 2025, LG's webOS-based Automotive Content Platform was also announced as the basis for Xbox Cloud Gaming in compatible internet-connected vehicles.

== Features ==
The webOS mobile platform introduced some innovative features, such as the cards interface and the gesture navigation, that are now standard in mobile operating systems such as iOS, Windows Phone, and Android.

Logo history

Palm webOS logo

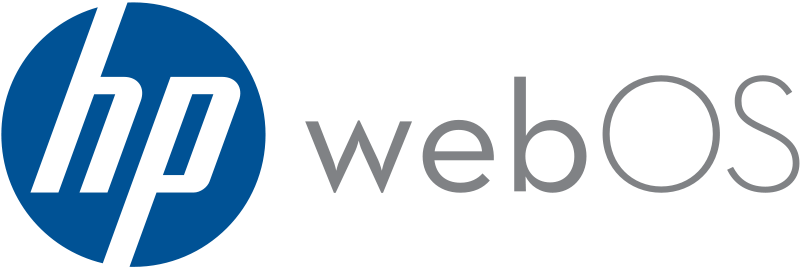
HP webOS logo

Open webOS logo

LG webOS logo

Features from releases of webOS
| Feature | LG webOS | Open webOS | HP/Palm webOS |
|---|---|---|---|
| Multitasking interface | Line cards | Cards | |
| Gesture interface | Magic Remote | touch screen and physical keyboard | |
| App store | LG Content Store | No | HP App Catalog |
| Over-the-air updates | Yes | | |
| Service discovery | Connect SDK | No | zeroconf / Touch to Share |
| Open source | Partial | Yes | Partial |

=== HP/Palm webOS ===
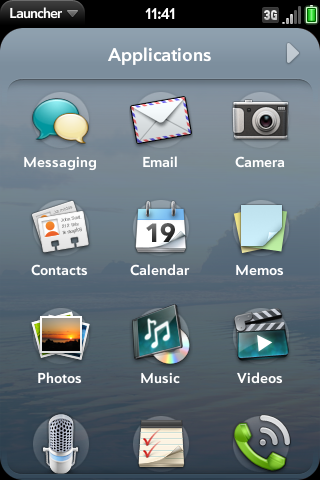
Screenshot of Palm webOS Launcher (2010)

==== Multitasking interface ====
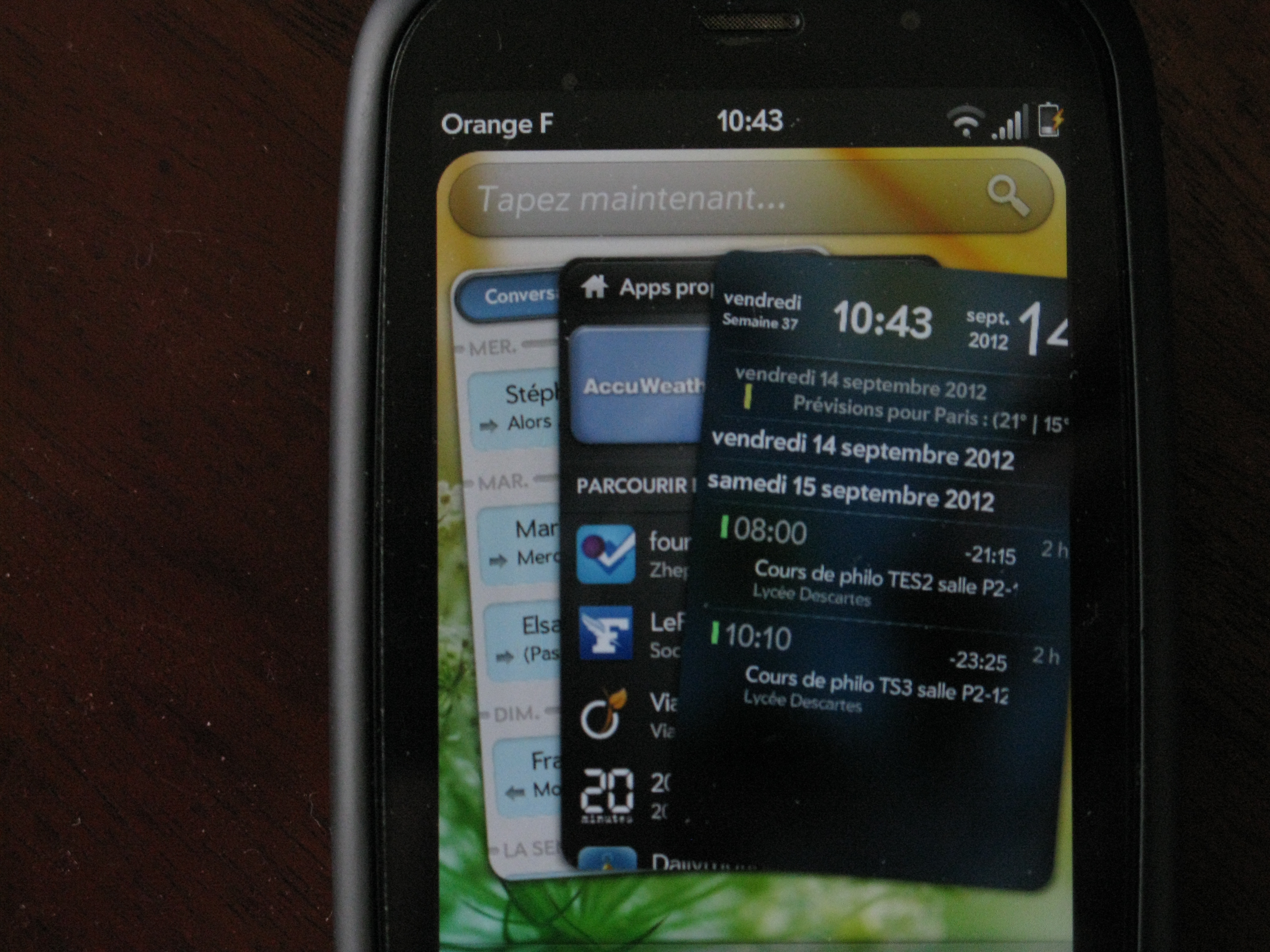
Stack feature of webOS on a HP Pre 3

Navigation uses multi-touch gestures on the touchscreen. The interface uses "cards" to manage multitasking and represent apps. The user switches between running apps with a flick from left and right on the screen. Apps are closed by flicking a "card" up—and "off"—the screen. The app "cards" can be rearranged for organization. webOS 2.0 introduced 'stacks', where related cards could be "stacked" together.

==== Synergy ====
Palm referred to integration of information from many sources as "Synergy." Users can sign into multiple email accounts from different providers and integrate all of these sources into a single list. Similar capabilities pull together calendars and also instant messages and SMS text messages from multiple sources.

==== Search and actions ====
webOS included Universal Search, which allowed users to search contacts, applications and web sources from the device. In webOS 2.0, this evolved into Just Type, which allowed users to begin actions such as writing an email, creating a message, updating a status or searching websites by typing directly from the launcher.

==== Over-the-air updates ====
The OS can be updated without docking to a PC, instead receiving OS updates over the carrier connection.

==== Notifications ====
The notification area is located on the bottom portion of the screen on phones, and on the top status bar area on tablets.

On phones, when a notification comes in, it slides in from the bottom of the screen. Due to the resizable nature of the Mojo and Enyo application frameworks, the app usually resizes itself to allow unhindered use while the notification is displayed. After the notification slides away, it usually remains as an icon. The user can then tap on the icons to expand them. Notifications can then be dismissed (sliding off the screen), acted upon (tapping), or left alone.

==== Sync ====
By default, data sync uses a cloud-based approach rather than using a desktop sync client. The first version of webOS shipped with the ability to sync with Apple's iTunes software by masquerading as an Apple device, but this feature was disabled by subsequent iTunes software updates.

==== Third-party applications ====
On HP webOS, officially vetted third-party apps are accessible to be installed on the device from the HP App Catalog.

As HP webOS replaced Palm OS, Palm commissioned MotionApps to code and develop an emulator called Classic, to enable backward compatibility to Palm OS apps. This operates with webOS version 1.0. Palm OS emulation was discontinued in WebOS version 2.0. MotionApps disengaged from Classic in 2010, citing HP Palm as "disruptive."

Another source of applications is homebrew software. Homebrew apps are not directly supported by HP. Programs used to distribute homebrew webOS apps include webOS Quick Install (Java-based sideloader for desktop computers) and Preware (a homebrew webOS app catalog, which must be sideloaded). If software problems do occur after installing homebrew programs, "webOS Doctor" (provided by HP) can restore a phone back to factory settings and remove changes made by homebrew apps and patches.

==== Developer mode ====
Developer mode allows for developer access of the device and is also used for digital forensic investigations. It can be accessed by typing webos20090606 on the device's keyboard, or on some devices typing upupdowndownleftrightleftrightbastart (a reference to the Konami code) on the cards view. Once in developer mode, data on the system partition can be accessed freely, even if the device was locked.

=== LG webOS ===
==== Smart TV features ====
LG has redesigned the UI of webOS, maintaining the card UI as a feature called "Simple switching" between open TV apps. The other two features promoted by the company are a simple connection (using an animated Clippy-like character called Bean Bird to aid the user through setup), and simple discovery. Bean Bird is only found in the initial webOS setup and images that appears in the settings on versions 1.0, 2.0, 3.0, 3.5, 4.0 and 4.5. Early versions of LG webOS TVs had a bean bird cursor. Bean Bird was removed from webOS since version 5.0 (although the user guide of the 5.0 version has the partial appearance of Bean Bird) and replaced by an AI assistant. Bean Bird is absent on the initial setup of LG Signage TVs using webOS, with the initial setup, but without Bean Bird.

Modern LG webOS TVs use the operating system as the main interface for streaming apps, content discovery, input switching, casting and smart home control. On supported models, webOS includes features such as AirPlay, Google Cast, LG ThinQ integration and compatibility with other smart home systems. LG Channels is also associated with webOS smart TVs as a free streaming-channel feature that integrates internet channels into the TV interface. Like other smart TV operating systems, webOS functions as an app and services platform, with differences between systems generally involving interface design, app availability, casting support, voice assistants, search, advertising and ecosystem integration.

==== Software upgrade ====
LG's webOS Re:New program provide operating system software upgrades for a five-year period following initial purchase. It is enable background updates, with users able to perform software updates similarly to smartphone operating system updates including when the television is powered off.

==== LG Gallery+ ====
LG Gallery+ is a webOS-integrated content service provides access to over 5,000 items categorized as fine art, cinematic moments, game-inspired scenes and photography. The service integrates with Google Gemini to generate AI-powered artwork based on user description.

It adjusts brightness and color levels for optimal viewing in different lighting conditions. The service includes background music options and is reported to support Bluetooth audio streaming for user playlists.

==== AI TV features ====
LG's 2026 television software, webOS 26, includes artificial intelligence functions for user personalization and content search. The system uses "AI Voice ID" to identify individual users by voice and switch to specific profiles. These profiles display information based on user data, such as weather, calendar events, and sports interests. The software uses Google Gemini to perform context-aware searches and provide content recommendations during playback.

Additional features include "AI Concierge," which provides automated troubleshooting and sports data, such as match win probabilities and live scores. A generative AI function allows for the creation of up to 20 on-screen images per month through a subscription service. Connectivity is managed through a Home Hub platform compatible with Matter, Apple AirPlay, and Google Cast. Security is provided by the LG Shield system, and LG offers software upgrades for the operating system for a period of five years

==== Automotive features ====
webOS for Automotive adapts the webOS platform from televisions to built-in vehicle infotainment displays. It is positioned as an in-car content platform rather than a navigation-only system, reflecting the wider shift toward software-defined vehicles, where infotainment systems can be updated and expanded through software over time. On supported vehicles, the platform can provide video streaming, native entertainment apps and cloud gaming experiences on vehicle screens.

Because these features are used inside moving vehicles, automotive entertainment platforms are generally subject to safety restrictions. webOS for Automotive also differs from phone-projection systems such as Apple CarPlay, which extend smartphone functions onto a vehicle display, while embedded automotive operating systems such as Android Automotive OS run directly on vehicle hardware.

== Platform ==
Underneath the graphical user interface, webOS has much in common with mainstream Linux distributions. Versions 1.0 to 2.1 use a patched Linux 2.6.24 kernel.

The list of open-source components used by the different releases of webOS, as well as the source code of and patches applied to each component, is available at the Palm Open Source webpage. This page also serves as a reference listing of the versions of webOS that have been publicly released.

In 2011, Enyo replaced Mojo, released in June 2009, as the software development kit (SDK). During the Open webOS period, HP released additional parts of the platform as open source, including the Luna system manager and the core application stack. The Open webOS roadmap also moved the platform toward a standard Linux kernel and broader hardware targets, while Enyo 2.0 was designed to run across major browsers.

As of 2025, webOS Open Source Edition continued to be maintained through the webOS OSE 2.x branch. webOS OSE 2.28.0 was released on March 27, 2025, with updates including Qt 6.8.1 and Yocto 5.0 “Scarthgap”. Modern webOS OSE documentation describes the platform as including components such as Luna Surface Manager, which works as the graphics and window manager and is implemented using Qt and QML. Luna Surface Manager also uses the Wayland protocol for compositor functionality.

== Hardware ==
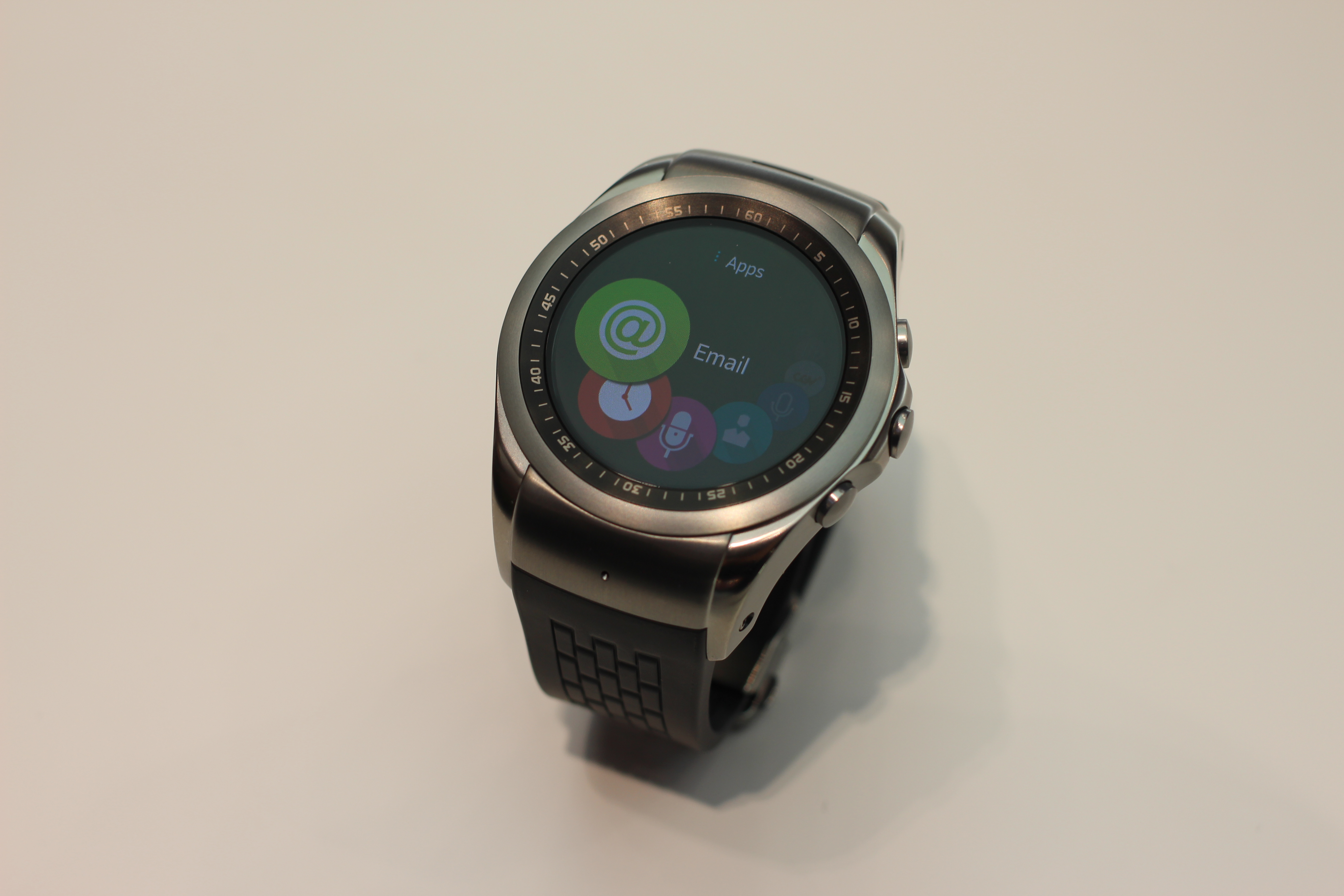
LG Watch Urbane LTE running LG webOS

| webOS version | Type | Device | Release date | Ref. |
|---|---|---|---|---|
| HP/Palm webOS | Phones | Palm Pre Pre Plus | June 6, 2009, January 25, 2010 | |
| HP/Palm webOS | Phones | Palm Pixi Pixi Plus | November 15, 2009, January 7, 2010 | |
| HP/Palm webOS | Phones | Palm Pre 2 | October 22, 2010 | |
| HP/Palm webOS | Phones | HP Veer | August 18, 2011 | |
| HP/Palm webOS | Phones | HP Pre 3 | August 18, 2011 | |
| HP/Palm webOS | Phones | Windsor, WindsorNot | Cancelled | |
| HP/Palm webOS | Phones | Mako | Cancelled | |
| HP/Palm webOS | Tablets | HP TouchPad | July 1, 2011 | |
| HP/Palm webOS | Tablets | HP TouchPad Go | Cancelled | |
| HP/Palm webOS | Tablets | Sapphire | Cancelled | |
| HP/Palm webOS | Tablets | Twain | Cancelled | |
| LG webOS | Televisions | LG smart TV models | Varies | |
| LG webOS | Televisions | LG smart laser projector | Varies | |
| LG webOS | | FOX TVs (Serbia) | Varies | |
| LG webOS | Refrigerators | LG smart fridge models | | |
| LG webOS | Watches | LG Watch Urbane LTE | April 27, 2015 | |
| LG webOS HUB | Televisions | Hyundai smart TV models | Unknown | |

== See also ==
- List of smart TV platforms and middleware software
- Enyo
- Mobile platform
- Access Linux Platform
- LuneOS
- List of WebOS devices
