= HP Veer =

2011 HP webOS smartphone

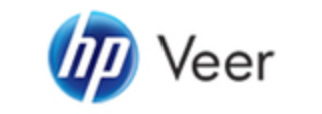

- Developer: Hewlett-Packard
- Type: Mobile Phone
- Released: May 15, 2011
- Introductory price: $99.99
- Discontinued: 18 August 2011
- Operating system: HP webOS 2.1.2
- CPU: Scorpion 800 MHz
- Memory: 512 MB Mobile DDR
- Storage: 8 GB (~6.5 GB available to users)
- Display: TFT 320x400 resolution (18-bit color); 66 mm (2.6 in) diagonally
- Graphics: Adreno 205 GPU
- Sound: Speakerphone dual-microphone for noise cancellation 3.5 mm stereo headset connector
- Input: Capacitive touchscreen (multitouch) slide-out keyboard accelerometer ambient light proximity sensor
- Camera: 5 MP camera with extended depth of field and video capture
- Connectivity: GSM 850/900/1800/1900; UMTS 900/1900/2100 or 850/1900/2100; WLAN IEEE 802.11 b/g/n Bluetooth 2.1 + EDR; USB 2.0; A-GPS (Within wireless coverage area only)
- Power: 910 mAh (non-removable); up to 5.0 hours of talk time or 300 hours of standby time.
- Dimensions: width: 54.5 mm (2.15 in) height: 84.0 mm (3.31 in) thickness: 15.1 mm (0.59 in)
- Weight: 103 g
- Predecessor: Palm Pixi Plus
- Related: HP Pre 3

HP Veer is a slider-style smartphone designed and developed by HP, announced on February 9, 2011. The device runs on HP webOS, is powered by a Qualcomm Snapdragon processor, and has a 2.6-inch screen. It was notable for its credit card-sized dimensions (and a depth that is comparable to the size of a deck of cards). The Veer was seen as the successor in the Palm line-up to the Pixi and earlier Centro models.

== History ==
The HP Veer was announced on February 9, 2011, along with the HP Pre 3 and the HP TouchPad. The Veer was released in the US on May 15, 2011 on the AT&T network, and was marketed as the HP Veer 4G. The device was slated to support the Touch-to-Share proximity-based sharing feature through a later update, but no official update supporting Touch-to-Share has been released although several users have purchased devices on eBay with fully implemented Touch-to-Share and SMS sharing support.

Following HP's announcement on August 18 that it would cease development of all WebOS hardware, the Veer was discontinued, and similar to the TouchPad, the price was lowered significantly in a firesale.

== Hardware ==
=== Processors ===
The HP Veer is powered by a Qualcomm Snapdragon MSM7230 which is a system-on-a-chip made by Qualcomm based on a 45 nanometer CMOS process. The Veer's own Snapdragon is composed, principally, of the Scorpion CPU, running at 800Mhz, an Adreno 205 GPU, a digital signal processor for cellular transmission/reception/processing (GSM, UMTS), gpsOne GPS module and an audio subsystem.

The Scorpion core implements the ARMv7 architecture which is similar to the ARM Cortex-A8 and supports the ARM NEON instruction set extensions and VFPv3 floating-point extensions (both referred as the “VeNum” media processing engine on Scorpion) which can accelerate, for example, image processing (camera). The main purpose of the VeNum engine is to boost the performance of the Scorpion CPU during multimedia processing resulting in power saving. The same task will be completed faster and with less power being consumed on a processor with VeNum media processing engine than one without.

The Adreno 205 GPU supports OpenGL ES 2.0, OpenGL ES 1.1, OpenVG 1.1, EGL 1.3, Direct3D Mobile, SVGT 1.2 and DirectDraw.

=== Screen and input ===
The HP Veer has a 66 mm (2.6 inch) capacitive touchscreen with a resolution of 320 x 400 pixel. The touchscreen is designed for a bare finger, or multiple fingers for multi-touch sensing. An accelerometer allows the orientation of the screen to change between portrait and landscape mode. There is a proximity sensor which deactivates the display and touchscreen when the device is brought near the face during a call.

There is a slide-out 4-row QWERTY keyboard.

The microphone is located on the slide-out keyboard.

=== Buttons ===
On the left side of the device, there is a volume button. On the upper right side, there is a power button. On the top side, there is a ringer switch for vibration mode.

=== Audio and USB connectivity ===
Both USB and 3.5 mm connectivities are provided by a proprietary magnetic connector.

=== Battery and SIM ===
The battery is rated at 910 mAh and is non-removable. HP states that it provides up to 5.0 hours of talk time or 300 hours of standby time.

=== Storage ===
There is 8 GB on board, of which about 6.5 GB is available to the user. There is no microSD card socket.

== Software ==
The Veer shipped with either webOS 2.1.1 or 2.1.2 depending on region and has not seen an official update since. It has the following pre-installed applications.

Application Name	Description
Web	Web browser; uses WebKit layout engine.
Email	Default email client.
Messaging	Standard SMS and MMS application; built in hooks for AIM, Yahoo, Google Chat, and Skype.
App Catalog	Access to HP App Catalog.
Memos	Note taking application.
Quickoffice	Suite of office applications to view spreadsheets, slideshow presentations, and standard word processing documents.
PDF View	PDF viewing software.
Maps	Default mapping application to search for locations, get directions, and view traffic patterns.
Contacts	Standard address book.
Music	Plays the music files stored on the device.
Phone	Standard phone dialer that allows the user to place phone calls.
Photos	View photographs on the device.
Videos	View videos on the device.
Camera	Take photographs.
Calculator	Calculator application.
Clock	A standard clock/alarm application.
YouTube	Browse all of the videos on YouTube.

Android has unofficially been ported as well.
