= Palm Pixi =

WebOS multimedia smartphone developed by Palm

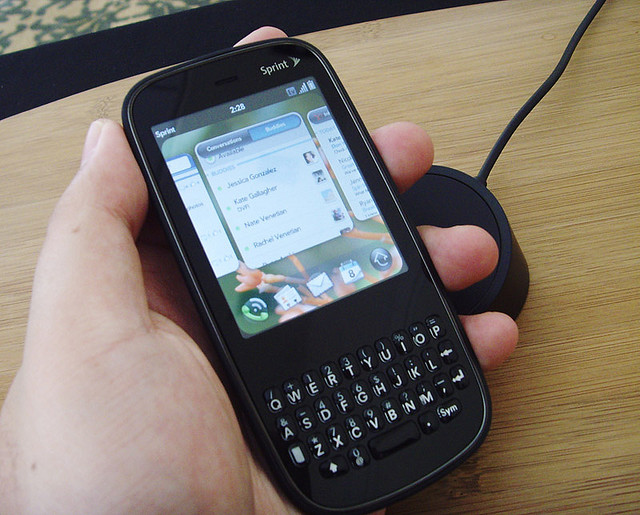
- Manufacturer: Palm, Inc.
- Availability by region: November 15, 2009 (Sprint)
- Related: Palm Pre, HP Veer
- Compatible networks: Sprint (non Plus) Verizon Wireless AT&T (both Pixi Plus)
- Form factor: Candybar smartphone
- Dimensions: 111 mm (4.4 in) (h); 55 mm (2.2 in) (w); 10.85 mm (0.427 in) (d)
- Weight: 92.5 g (3.26 oz)
- Operating system: Palm webOS
- CPU: Qualcomm MSM7627; 600 MHz ARM applications core and 400 MHz ARM modem core
- Memory: 256 MB 166 MHz DDR RAM
- Storage: Flash memory 8 GB (7 GB available to user)
- Removable storage: N/A
- Battery: 3.7 V 1150 mAh; Internal rechargeable removable lithium-ion battery
- Rear camera: 2-megapixel camera with LED flash, geotagging
- Display: 320×400 px, 2.63 in (67 mm), 18-bit color Sub-HVGA
- Connectivity: Bluetooth 2.1+EDR, MicroUSB, A-GPS; Pixi Plus: Wi-Fi(802.11b/g); CDMA version: Dual band CDMA2000/EV-DO Rev. A 800/1900 MHz; GSM version: Quad band GSM 850 900 1800 1900 MHz GPRS/EDGE and Tri band UMTS 850, 1900, 2100 MHz HSDPA
- Data inputs: 2.63 inch Multi-touch touchscreen display, keyboard, volume controls, proximity and ambient light sensors, 3-axis accelerometer
- Hearing aid compatibility: M4/T4

The Palm Pixi and Palm Pixi Plus are multimedia smartphones, developed by Palm. The original Pixi was announced on September 8, 2009, on Palm's official blog and was released on November 15, 2009, on the Sprint carrier network in the U.S. It was viewed as a successor to the Palm Centro and was Palm's second webOS device, after the Palm Pre.

The phones were considered the smallest "smartphones" on the market and are able to browse the internet, access Facebook and other social media sites, as well as online banking.

The Pixi Plus was announced at CES in 2010. The Plus versions include Wi-Fi and the ability to act as a 3G Mobile hotspot (sometimes known as MiFi). This phone was released January 7, 2010, for the Verizon Wireless carrier network, and subsequently for AT&T Mobility, and was released on May 28, 2010, for O2 in the United Kingdom.

The HP Veer is considered to be the successor to the Palm PIxi and Pixi Plus, after Palm was purchased by HP.

== Specifications ==
The Pixi has both touchscreen capability and a QWERTY keyboard with soft gel keycaps. To access the battery and interior hardware of the phone, the soft-touch plastic rear cover is removable.

Palm, Inc., detailed the specifications of the Palm Pixi on the company's product web page. According to the information given, the Pixi features a 2.63-inch capacitive touchscreen with an 18-bit color 320x400 screen resolution Sub-HVGA display. The device weighs 92.5 grams (3.51 ounces) and is 55.0 mm (2.17 inches) in width, 111.0 mm (4.37 inches) in height and 10.85 mm (0.43 inches) thick. On board radios include GPS, Dual-band CDMA2000 and 3G EVDO Rev A data networking. E-mail supports Microsoft Exchange services and direct push, as well as POP3, IMAP, Yahoo! Mail, Gmail, AOL and Microsoft Outlook. Messaging features include IM, SMS and MMS. It features a 2-megapixel camera with LED flash, proximity sensor, accelerometer, Bluetooth 2.1 (with A2DP stereo), MicroUSB connector, 3.5 mm headphone jack and 8 gigabytes of flash memory (roughly 7 gigabytes is available to the user).

Like the Palm Pre, the Pixi features webOS, which includes over-the-air Synergy synchronization.

The Pixi Plus has the same display as the Pixi. The hardware specs include a Qualcomm MSM7627 (600 MHz) CPU, Adreno 200 graphics, 8 GB of storage, 256 MB of RAM, 802.11 b/g Wi-Fi and Bluetooth 2.1. It is capable of using HSDPA (up to 3.6 Mbit/s) as well as GPRS and offers A-GPS for navigation and location services. The battery is a changeable 1,150-mAh unit with 5.5h talk time (2G) and 350h standby, according to the manufacturer. The sole camera is a 2-megapixel fixed-focus unit on the rear paired with an LED flash.

Touchstone wireless charging compatibility is optional and requires a separate back cover.
