= Palm Pre =

2009 smartphone

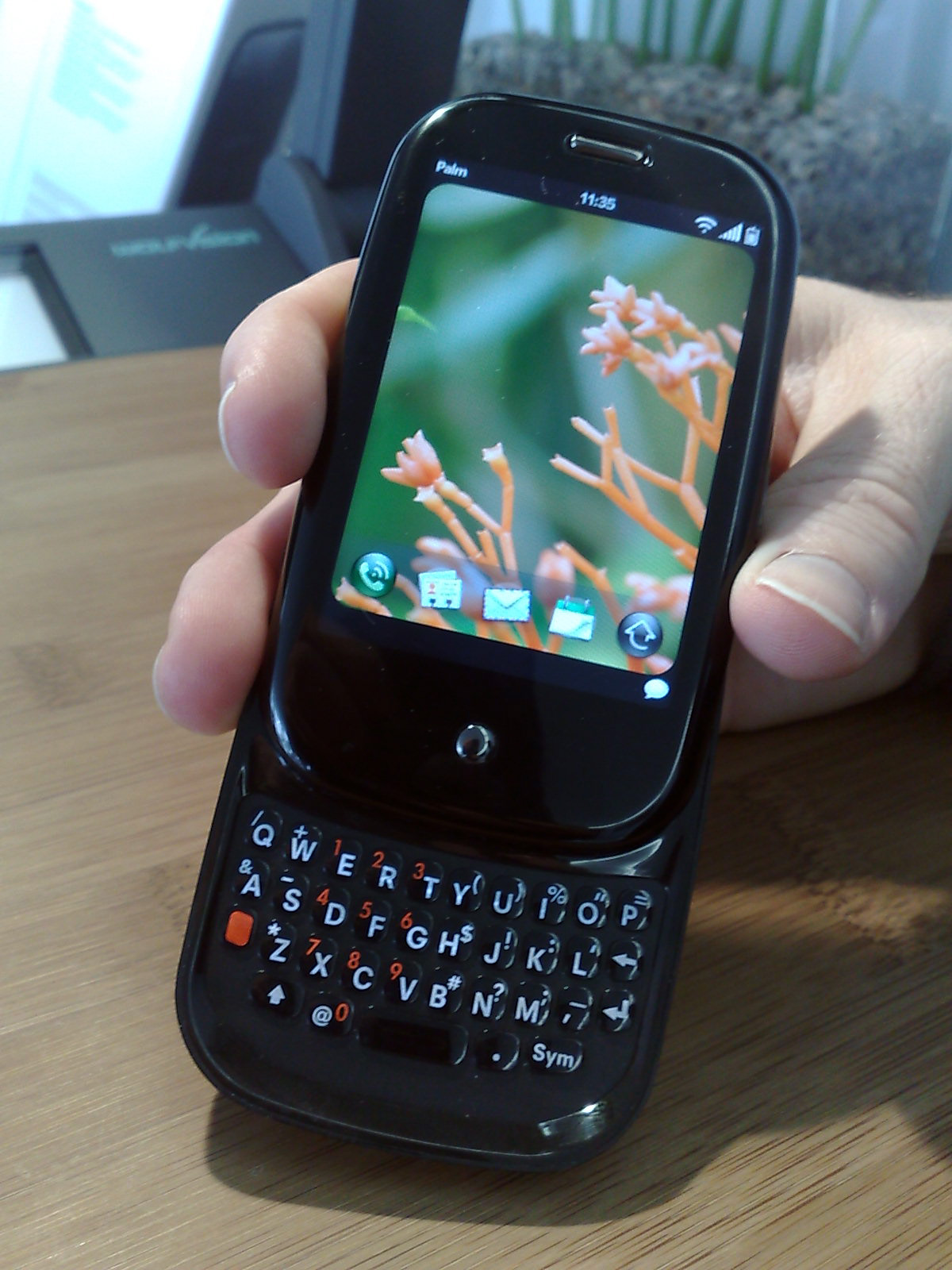
- A Palm Pre with keyboard extended on the home screen
- Manufacturer: Palm, Inc.
- Availability by region: June 6, 2009 (Sprint Nextel); August 27, 2009 (Bell Mobility); October 13/16, 2009 (O2); Late 2009 (Movistar); Q1 2010 (Verizon Wireless)
- Successor: Palm Pre 2
- Related: Palm Pixi
- Form factor: Slider smartphone
- Dimensions: 100.53 mm (3.958 in) (h); 59.57 mm (2.345 in) (w); 16.95 mm (0.667 in) (d)
- Weight: 135 g (4.8 oz)
- Operating system: Palm webOS
- CPU: 600 MHz (underclocked to 500 MHz) Texas Instruments OMAP 3430 (ARM Cortex A8 + PowerVR SGX)
- Memory: Original: 256 MB 166MHz DDR DRAM; Pre Plus: 512 MB 166MHz DDR DRAM
- Storage: Flash memory Original: 8 GB; Pre Plus: 16 GB
- Battery: 3.7 V 1150 mAh; Internal rechargeable removable lithium-ion battery
- Rear camera: 3.2 megapixel camera with LED flash, "extended depth of field", and geotagging
- Display: 320 × 480 px, 3.1 in (79 mm) HVGA, 24-bit color LCD
- Connectivity: Wi-Fi (802.11b/g), Bluetooth 2.1+EDR, MicroUSB, A-GPS; CDMA version: Dual band CDMA2000/EV-DO Rev. A 800, 1900 MHz; GSM version: Quad band GSM 850/900/1800/1900 MHz GPRS/EDGE; Dual band UMTS 850/1900 or 900/2100 MHz HSDPA
- Data inputs: Multi-touch touchscreen display, volume controls, proximity and ambient light sensors, 3-axis accelerometer
- Hearing aid compatibility: M4
- Website: palm.com at the Wayback Machine (archived 2011-02-13)

The Palm Pre (/ˈpriː/, styled as palm prē) is a multitasking smartphone that was designed and marketed by Palm with a multi-touch screen and a sliding keyboard. The smartphone was the first to use Palm's Linux-based mobile operating system, webOS. The Pre functions as a camera phone and a portable media player, and has location and navigation capabilities. The Pre also serves as a personal information manager, has a number of communication and collaboration applications, and has Bluetooth and Wi-Fi connectivity built-in.

The Pre was launched in the United States on June 6, 2009, with Sprint, and later in Canada with Bell Mobility. A GSM version of the original Pre was launched later in 2009 on a number of networks in Europe and in Mexico. A revised model, the Palm Pre Plus, which doubled the available memory and internal storage, was launched on January 25, 2010, for Verizon Wireless and later released on AT&T Mobility on May 16, 2010. The third generation of Palm Pre, the Palm Pre 2, which uses HP webOS 2.0, was announced October 2010. The Palm Pre became the fastest selling phone in Sprint's history, and it has been a widely praised device.

== History and availability ==
Apple accused the Pre of copying elements of the user interface, with Apple then-COO Tim Cook stating that "we will not stand for people ripping off our IP" and Palm responding that they "have the tools necessary to defend [themselves]", hinting at Palm's large portfolio of patents.

On May 19, 2009, Sprint and Palm announced the Pre would be available beginning June 6, 2009.

On May 28, 2009, Verizon Wireless announced that it would also carry the Palm Pre in "about six months." A later comment from a Sprint spokesperson indicated that the launch carrier would have US exclusivity rights to the Pre "through 2009." Sprint's CEO, Dan Hesse, commented that his company and Palm had agreed not to discuss the length of the exclusivity deal, but remarked that "it's not six months."

On July 7, 2009, Telefónica announced that they would exclusively carry the Palm Pre in the UK, Spain, Ireland and Germany on their O2 and Movistar networks, with availability "before the winter holidays".

On July 27, 2009, during the company's second quarter conference call, Verizon chief operating officer Denny Strigl announced that Verizon Wireless would begin selling the Palm Pre in early 2010.

News coverage of the launch noted that the sales quantity was a record for any Sprint phone launch, and estimated sales of approximately 50,000 units for the day, and up to 100,000 for the week. However, reports stated that sales of the Pre in July and beginning of August were much lower than expected.

On November 11, 2009, Palm announced that the Pre would be available in Mexico, naming Telcel the exclusive carrier for the Pre in the nation. Sales in Mexico began on November 27.

=== Pre Plus ===
A new version of the smartphone, the Palm Pre Plus, was announced at CES 2010. Differences included removal of the center button, 16 GB storage memory (8 GB on the original Pre), doubling the RAM from 256 MB to 512 MB, and built-in Touchstone compatibility. The keyboard and slider mechanism were also refined. In the US, it was initially sold exclusively along with the Pixi Plus by Verizon Wireless. On March 22, 2010, Palm announced that it would be releasing both the Pre Plus and the Pixi Plus on the AT&T network in the "coming months". O2 launched the Palm Pre Plus on May 16, 2010, for US$149.99 with a free Touchstone charger for new customers.

=== Pre 2 ===
On October 19, 2010, HP announced the third generation of Palm Pre, the Palm Pre 2, which used HP webOS 2.0. The device had a 1 GHz processor, 512 MB RAM, a 5-megapixel camera, Adobe Flash Player 10.1 Beta and more durable hardware including a Gorilla Glass screen. The phone was released to consumers in France (2010 October; SFR), Canada (2010 December; Rogers), and the U.S. (2011 February; Verizon) and was also available unlocked from HP. HP stated that Verizon Wireless customers would be able to use Skype Mobile for Skype-to-Skype calls and messaging when webOS 2.0 is released for consumer use. In December 2011 HP provided a firmware update to 2.2.4.

=== HP Pre^{3} ===
The HP Pre 3 was a touchscreen smartphone by Hewlett-Packard, announced in 2011 alongside the Veer and TouchPad. It featured a 3.58-inch touchscreen, 802.11 a/b/g/n Wi-Fi, and a 5MP camera. Briefly available in the UK, it was discontinued shortly after release, with limited US availability through employee sales.

== Internal hardware ==
=== Screen and input ===
The original Pre has a 3 megapixel digital camera with LED flash.

=== Connectivity ===
The Pre is available with high-speed connectivity on either EVDO Rev. A or UMTS HSDPA, depending on location. The Pre also includes 802.11b/g WiFi and Bluetooth 2.1+EDR with support for A2DP stereo headsets. A-GPS with support for turn-by-turn navigation is also included, though access to aGPS features remains locked for Verizon Wireless users. For charging and data-transfer, the Pre uses a microUSB connector with USB 2.0 support, and audio output is supported by a standard 3.5 mm headphone jack. While the phone reports support for the Bluetooth DUN protocol, Sprint has not permitted use of the Pre in tethered (or "Phone as Modem") mode. Verizon does support tethering via their Mobile Hot Spot support. But the homebrew community has many "patches" and apps that allow you to change settings on the Pre, one of them includes a free hotspot app for the Sprint users.

=== Storage capacity ===
The Pre has 8 GB of internal flash storage (approximately 7.4 GB of which is user accessible). The Pre does not have a flash memory card slot. The Pre Plus has 16 GB of internal flash storage.

=== Charging ===
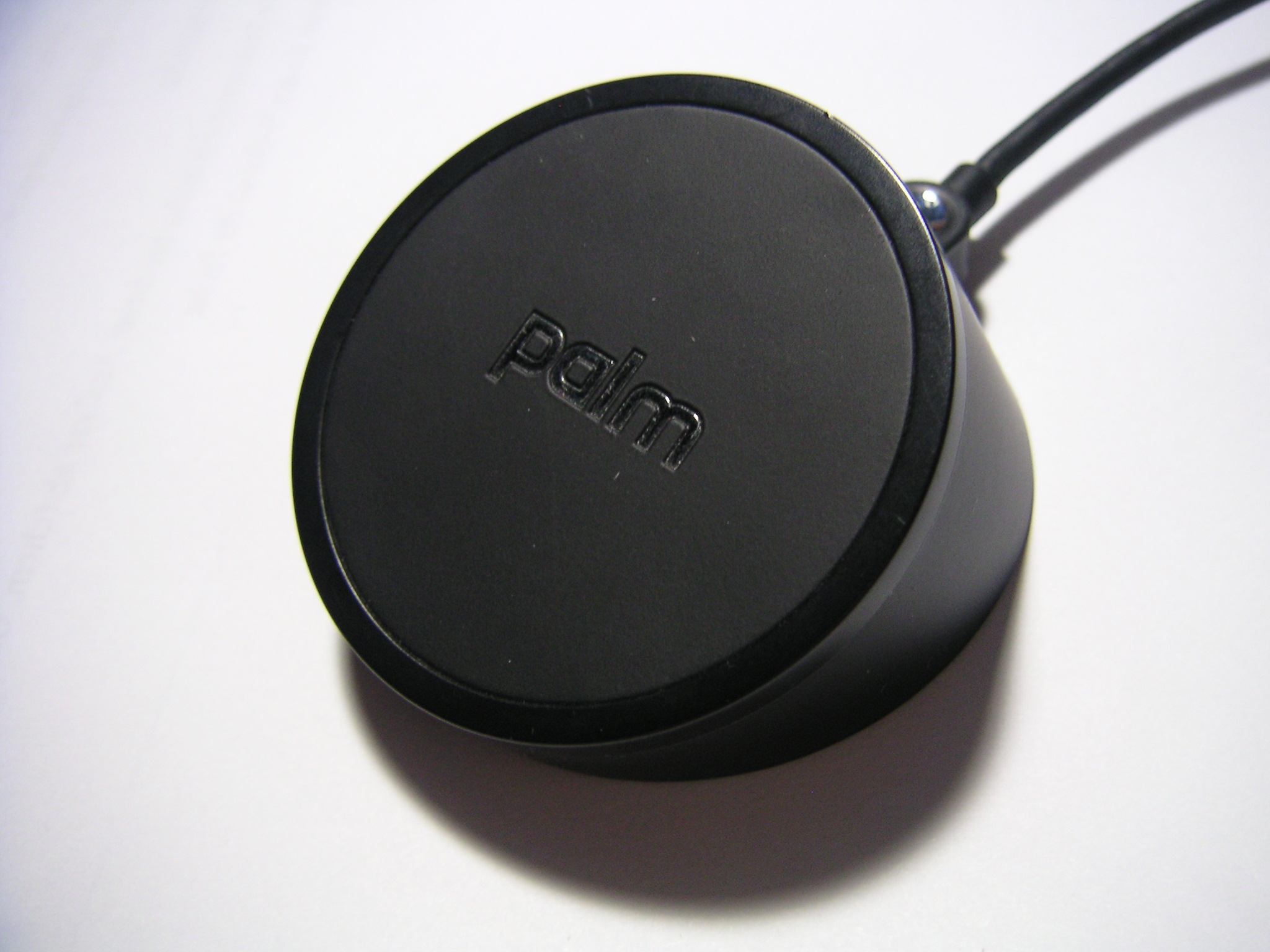
A Touchstone Charger connected with a Micro-USB cable for power supply

The Pre can be charged either using the supplied MicroUSB cable, or by using an optional accessory for wireless charging using a proprietary electromagnetic induction charging dock, dubbed the "Touchstone Charger." The Touchstone Charger requires a compatible back cover, which was sold separately from the Pre but included in subsequent models.

== Software ==
=== Interface ===
The webOS interface is based on a system of "cards" used to manage multitasking. webOS also supports multi-touch gestures, enabling most navigational input to be made using the touchscreen. The Pre does not include a virtual keyboard, only a portrait-oriented slide-out keyboard. An onscreen, virtual keyboard is embedded in the code and can be made available through a third party patch.

=== Synergy ===
webOS includes a feature called Synergy that integrates information from many sources. webOS allows a user to sign into accounts on Gmail, Yahoo!, Facebook, LinkedIn, and Microsoft Outlook (via Exchange ActiveSync). Contacts from all sources are then integrated into a single list. Synergy was highly innovative, and was regarded by many as a highlight of the new operating system, but received some criticism for being undiscerning in what it included in the contacts application. For example, Engadget commented that it had contacts that were simply Birthdays extracted from Facebook.

=== Syncing ===
The device makes use of the cloud based services model, but uses no desktop sync client (in the style of Palm's HotSync synchronization method).

However Palm has referenced a number of solutions for users who need to sync with their desktop software like Palm Desktop, Microsoft Outlook, or IBM Lotus Notes. Additionally, Mark/Space, Inc. has announced Macintosh desktop sync software, and Chapura such software for Windows. Palm has offered an online guide to help customers.

== Information gathering by Palm ==
According to (now former) Debian developer Joey Hess, the Palm Pre periodically sends users' information to Palm. Palm gathers users' GPS information, along with data on every application used, and for how long it was used. This information is uploaded to Palm on a daily basis. There is an "opt-out" when the user first uses the GPS system and this is common for all mobile carriers and with Google Maps. There is also an opt-out on GPS data being sent to Google.

== Reception ==
When showcased in January 2009, five months prelaunch, the Pre received positive reviews, winning CNET's Best in Show, Best in Category: Cell Phones & Smartphones, and People's Voice for CES 2009.

The Palm Pre suffered from numerous quality issues. The slider mechanism felt loose and could wiggle, an issue that became known as the "Oreo Twist" by users. Palm aimed to address the issue in the Pre Plus, making the slider mechanism stronger. The curved plastic screen seemed delicate, sometimes cracking from being in a pocket, and there were reports of faulty headphone jacks. On the Palm Pre Plus, characters sometimes appeared twice when typing, although the user has only hit the key once. Many reviews noted the poor build quality of the phones. In Engadget's second open letter to Palm, they cited "hardware issues which plagued the Pre, with no outward acknowledgment or rush to correct."

Overall sales were modest from the outset. Users expressed intense concern about the slow pace of new webOS releases and the absence of substantially improved hardware. Comments were critical of the lengthy delay in releasing the promised Flash application, dysfunctional document handling, speculation of what could be underlying the technological or business reasons for the slow release of the webOS 2 upgrade for existing phones, and a concern that when eventually released, the webOS 2 upgrade would be incompatible with Palm OS emulation. Media opinion in 2010 December was not enthusiastic. While it was the fastest-selling cell phone in Sprint's history, the Pre has been described as Palm's swan song since the sales were not enough to keep the company afloat, leading to its acquisition by HP. Nonetheless, one journalist wrote that he still regarded the Pre as innovative even ten years after its launch, since it pioneered features later found in iOS and Android, plus webOS could easily be modified without jailbreaking nor unlocking the bootloader in contrast to iOS and Android.

== See also ==
- Mobile device
- OMAP
