= Palm (device line) =

Line of personal digital assistants and mobile phones

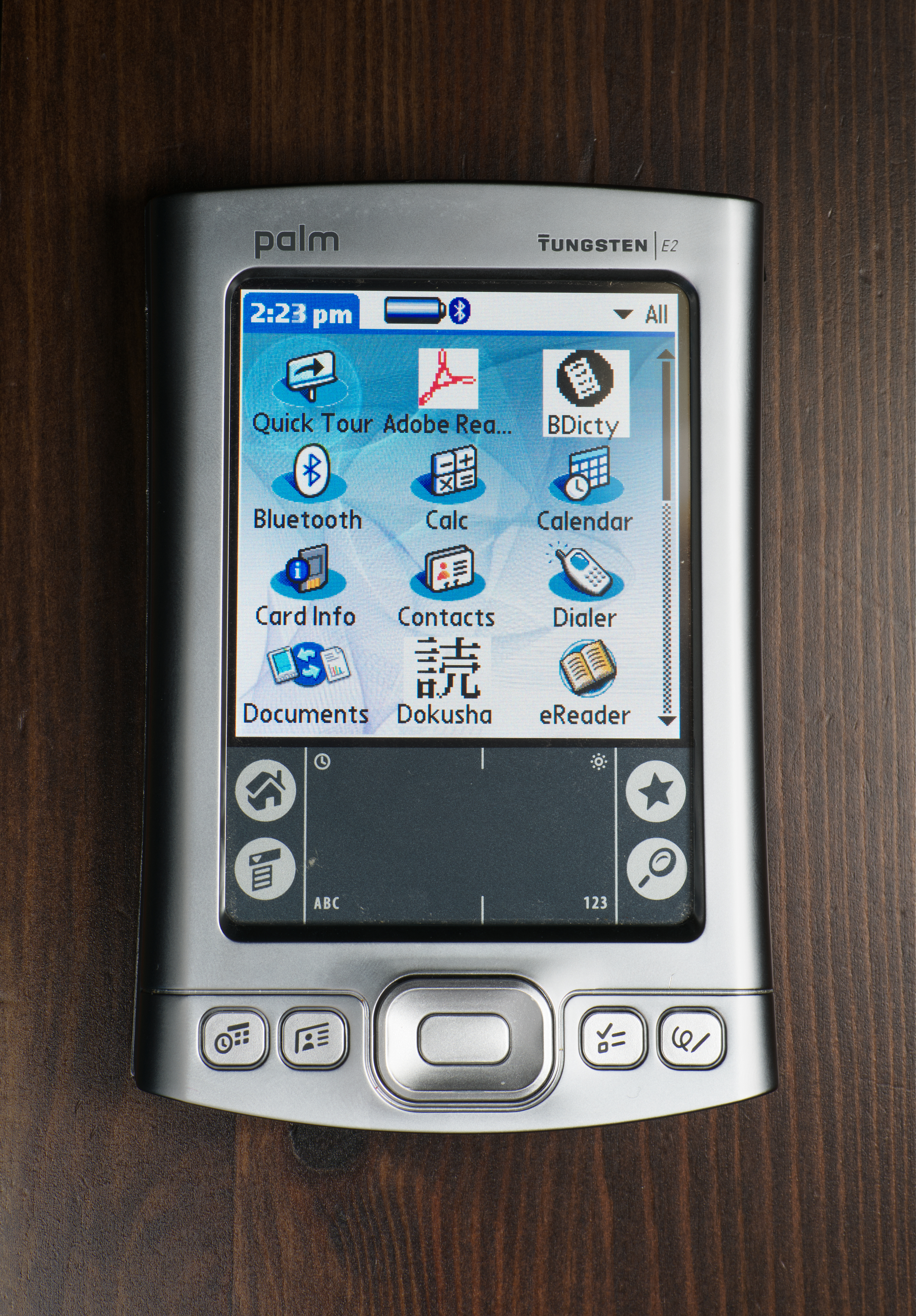
- A Palm Tungsten E2 PDA released in 2005
- Developer: Palm, Inc. (1996–2010); Hewlett-Packard Company (2010–2011)
- Type: Personal digital assistant (1996–2009); Smartphone (2003–2011)
- Lifespan: 1996–2011
- Operating system: Palm OS; Windows Mobile; webOS
- Connectivity: Paging networking: Mobitex (Palm.net); Cellular networking: GSM, CDMA
- Related: HP TouchPad; Palm PVG100

Palm is a discontinued line of personal digital assistants (PDAs) and smartphones that were marketed from 1996 to 2011, developed by California-based Palm, Inc., originally called Palm Computing, Inc. (Note: Until 2000.) and briefly as palmOne, Inc. (Note: From 2003 to 2005.) Most of Palm's products ran the in-house Palm OS software, which was later also licensed to other OEMs. Palm devices are often remembered as "the first wildly popular handheld computers," responsible for ushering in the smartphone era.

The first Palm device, the PalmPilot 1000, led a growing market for portable computing devices when it was released in 1996, where previous attempts such as Apple's Newton failed or others like Hewlett-Packard's 200LX only serving a niche target market. Several generations of the Palm were released until, after the Palm VII, the line was split in 2002 into a high-end enterprise product (Palm Tungsten) and a budget-friendly product (Palm Zire). A year later, cellular phones were also started to be marketed (Palm Treo) as a result of Palm's purchase of Handspring, Inc..

In 2005, the PDA line was updated to the new Palm TX and Z22 products and the company also made its first and only hard disk drive based PDA, the LifeDrive. From 2006 some of its Treo smartphones shifted over to run Microsoft's Windows Mobile, and in 2007 came the first consumer-oriented smartphone (Palm Centro). Palm ceased development of PDAs entirely in 2009 and designed Palm OS's modern successor, webOS, which first shipped with the Palm Pre smartphone. In 2011, Hewlett-Packard (HP), who had earlier purchased the Palm company, discontinued the Palm brand and started releasing new devices in this line under their own HP brand, but discontinued the hardware later that same year.

== History ==
=== Initial development ===
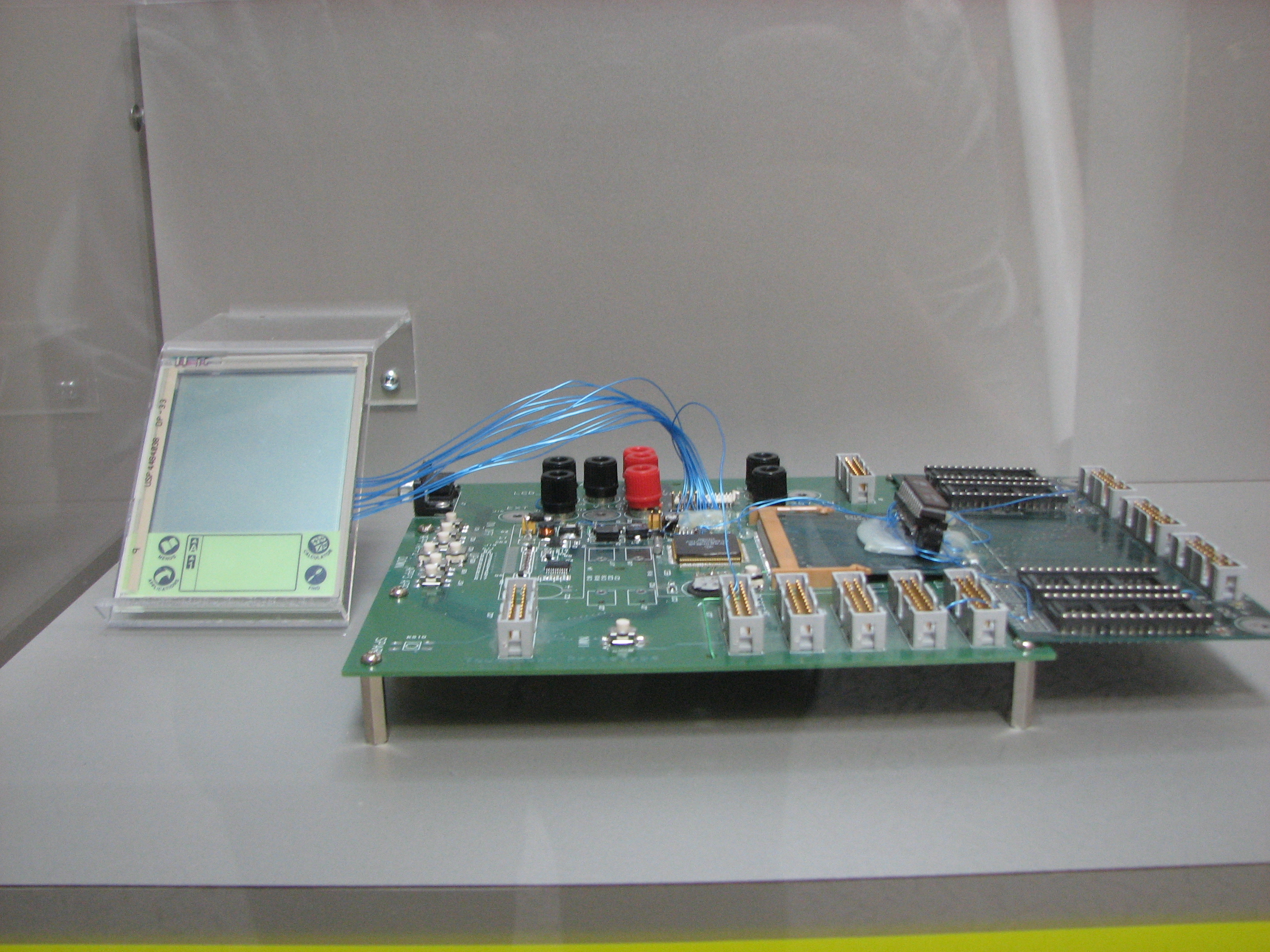
The Palm Pilot prototype

Pilot was the name of the first generation of personal digital assistants manufactured by Palm Computing in 1996 (by then a division of USRobotics).

The inventors of the Pilot were Jeff Hawkins, Donna Dubinsky, and Ed Colligan, who founded Palm Computing in 1992. The original purpose of this company was to create handwriting recognition software, named PalmPrint, and personal information management (PIM) software, named PalmOrganizer for the PEN/GEOS based Zoomer devices. Their research convinced them, however, they could create better hardware as well. Before starting development of the Pilot, Hawkins said he carried a block of wood, the size of the potential Pilot, in his pocket for a week. Palm was widely perceived to have benefited from the notable, if ill-fated, earlier attempts to create a popular handheld computing platform by Go Corporation, Tandy, and Apple Computer (Newton).

=== PalmPilot1000 and 5000 (1996) ===
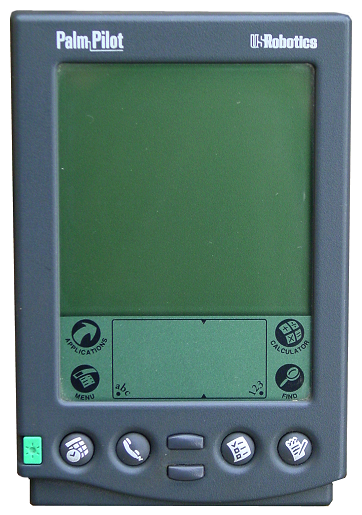
An early model—the PalmPilot Personal

The prototype for the first Palm Connected Organizer was called "Palm Taxi". In 1996 Palm released its first generation PDA, the PalmPilot 1000 and 5000. After the out-of-court settlement in 1998 of a trademark infringement lawsuit brought by the Pilot Pen Corporation, the company no longer used that name, instead referring to its handheld devices as Palm Connected Organizers or more commonly as "Palms".

The first Palms, the Pilot 1000 and Pilot 5000, had no infrared port, backlight, or flash memory, but did have a serial communications port. Their RAM size was 128 kB and 512 kB respectively, and they used version 1 of Palm OS. Later, it became possible to upgrade the Pilot 1000 or 5000's internals to up to 1 MB of internal RAM. This was done with the purchase of an upgrade module sold by Palm, and the replacement of some internal hardware components. Originally, it was conceived that all Palm PDAs were to be hardware-upgradable to an extent, but ultimately, this capability gave way to external memory slots and firmware-upgradable flash memory after the Palm III series.

=== Subsequent generations (1998-2000) ===
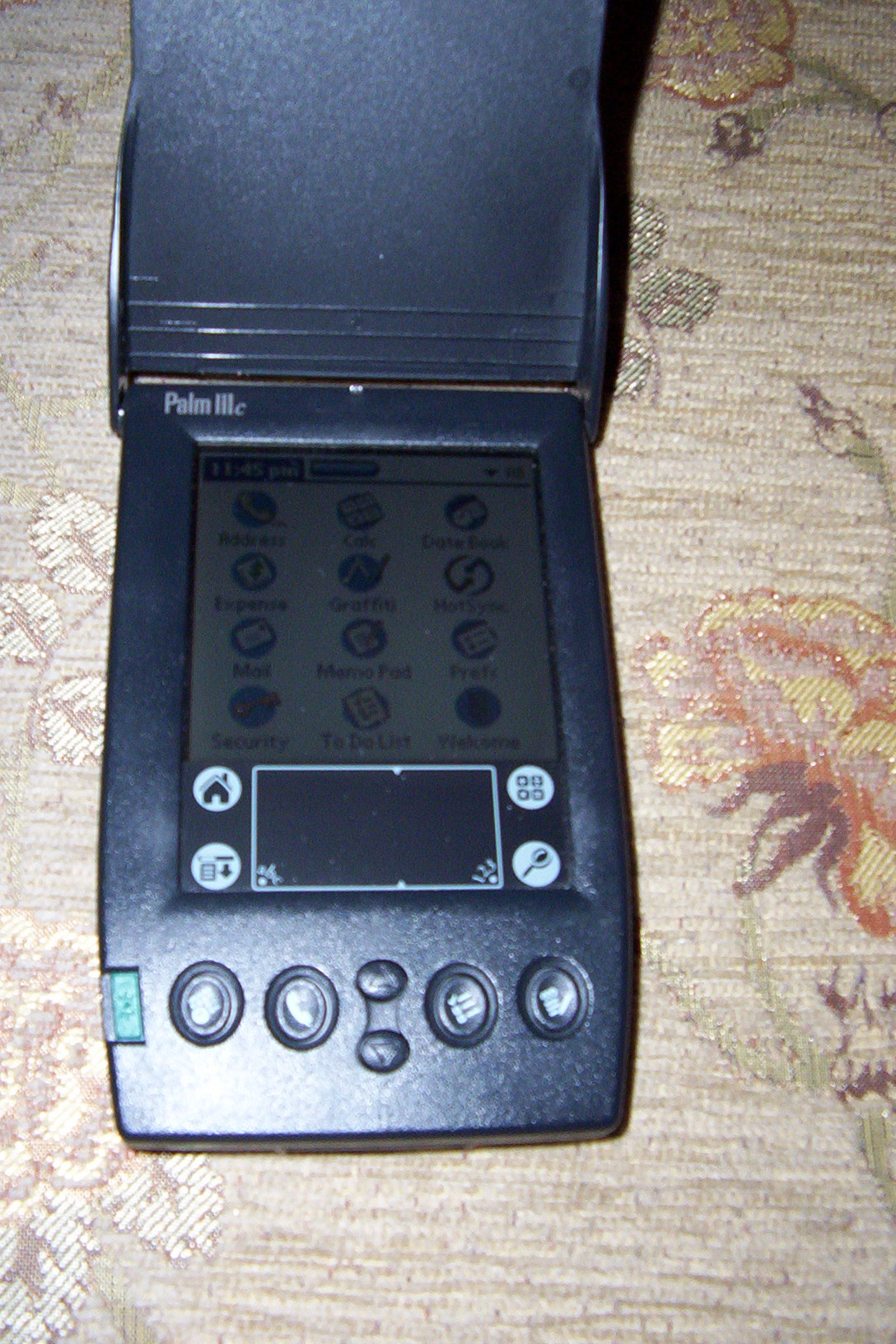
The Palm IIIc was the first Palm with a color screen.

The next couple of Palms, the PalmPilot Personal and PalmPilot Professional, had backlit screens, but no infrared port or flash memory. Their RAM size was 512 kB and 1024 kB respectively. They used version 2 of the Palm OS.

Palm III, and all the following Palms, did not have the word "Pilot" in their name due to the previously mentioned trademark dispute. The Palm III had an IR port, backlight, and flash memory. The latter allowed the user to upgrade Palm OS, or, with some external applications, to store programs or data in flash memory. It ran on two standard AAA batteries. It was able to retain enough energy for 10–15 minutes to prevent data loss during battery replacement. It had 2 megabytes of memory, large at the time, and used Palm OS 3. (Palm also produced an upgrade card for the Pilot series, which made them functionally equivalent to a Palm III.)

Meanwhile, with Palm Computing now a subsidiary of 3Com, the founders felt they had insufficient control over the development of the Palm product. As a result, they left 3Com and founded Handspring in June 1998. When they left Palm, Hawkins secured a license for the Palm OS for Handspring, and the company became the first Palm OS licensee. Handspring went on to produce the Handspring Visor, a clone of the Palm handhelds that included a hardware expansion slot (early Palm devices also had a hardware expansion slot, however this was for device upgrade purposes, not peripherals) and used slightly modified software.

The next versions of Palm used Palm OS 3.1. These included Palm IIIx with 4 Megabytes of memory, Palm IIIe without flash memory or hardware expansion slot (and available for lower price), Palm V with 2 Megabytes of memory, and, Palm Vx with 8 Megabytes of memory.

Palm VII had wireless connection to some Internet services, but this connection worked only within the United States. It used Palm OS 3.2.

Palm IIIc was the first Palm handheld with a color screen. It used Palm OS 3.5, which provided extensive tools for writing color applications. Some of these newer handhelds, for example Palm V, used internal rechargeable batteries. Later, this feature became standard for all Palms.

Palm handhelds up to 2002 contained Motorola DragonBall processors, part of the Motorola 68000 family. Starting with the Palm Tungsten, the platform transitioned to the ARM architecture with Texas Instruments, Samsung, and Intel as suppliers. As ARM had previously been used in the Apple Newton series, the platform had significant investment in mobile and low-power applications.

=== Tungsten, Treo and others (2000-2009) ===
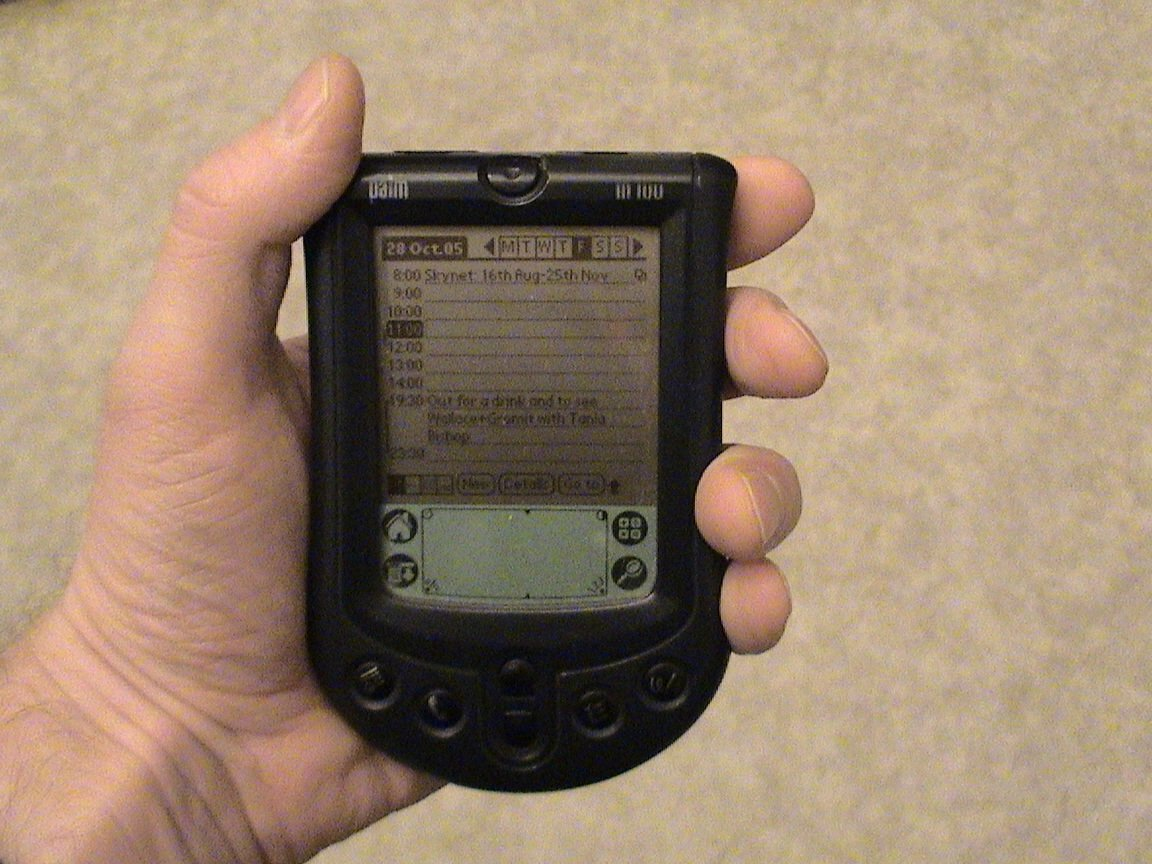
The monochrome Palm m100

By 2000, Palm had some 74 percent market share, however it was now losing relevance following the launch of Microsoft's Pocket PC platform. In 2001 it was losing ground to Pocket PCs such as Compaq's iPAQ (which all ran on ARM processors) but also to Handspring devices.

Palm Computing was spun off into its own company (called Palm Incorporated) in 2000. Handspring later merged with Palm to form palmOne in 2003 when Palm Inc. split into companies based upon selling hardware (palmOne) and the software (PalmSource). In 2005, palmOne acquired the full rights to the Palm name by purchasing the shared rights PalmSource owned and changed names back to Palm again. PalmSource was acquired by ACCESS Systems in 2005, which subsequently sold the Palm OS source code back to Palm, Inc. in December 2006.

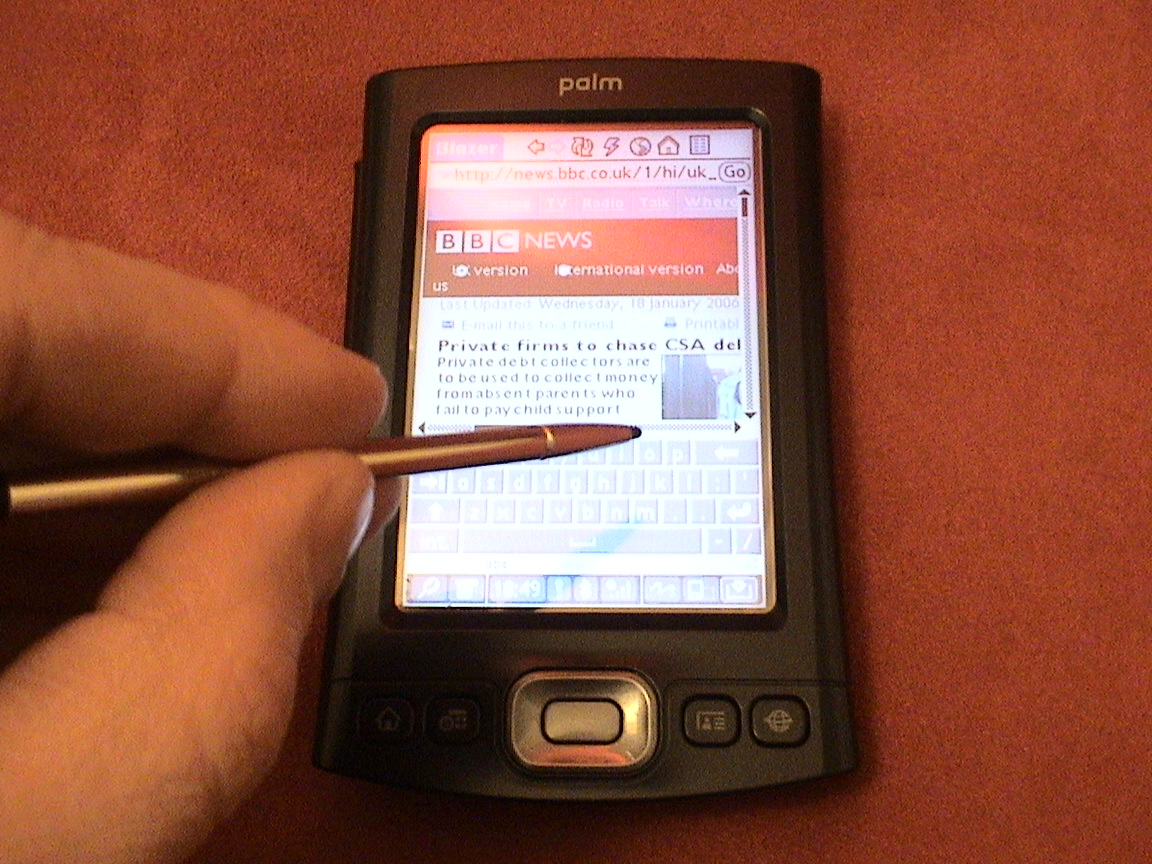
A Palm TX personal digital assistant from 2005

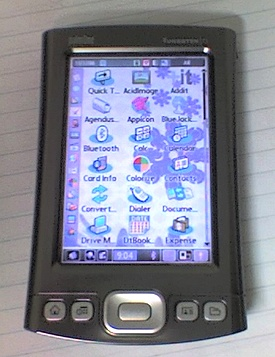
The Palm Tungsten T5

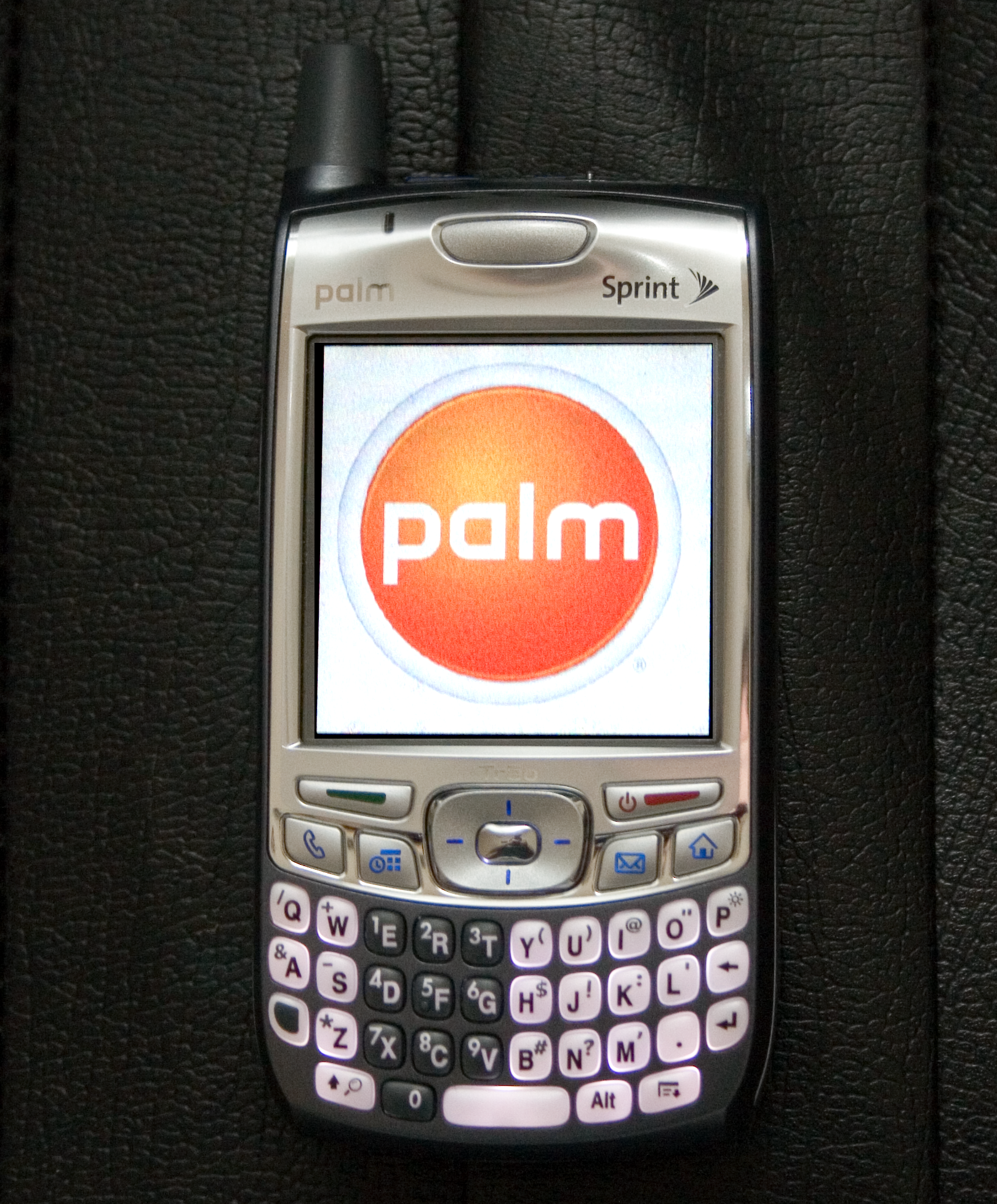
The Palm Treo 700p is one of many smartphones produced that combines Palm PDA functions with a cell phone, allowing for built-in voice and data.

Palm handhelds continued to advance, including the ability to access computer hard drives via USB cables, and began to merge with smartphones. The "Treo 700w" was one of the later offerings that combined a Palm handheld with mobile phone, e-mail, MMS, and instant messaging (SMS) technology. It was also the first Palm-branded device to use Microsoft software (Windows Mobile) instead of its own Palm OS. It became widely expected that Palm handhelds as a PDA-only device would disappear as multifunction handhelds like the Treo 650 declined in price. Multifunction handhelds generally include a wider range of abilities traditionally found in separate devices, for example: an MP3 player, mobile phone, camera, Wi-Fi and Bluetooth. The Treo 650+ was a series of smartphones that included a camera, mp3 player, Bluetooth, and a mobile phone. The Zire 71 and 72 series also had these additional features. In 2007, Palm released the Palm Centro, a smartphone running Palm OS. Different in overall appearance from the Treo, it was most notably thinner. The Centro was a somewhat successful smartphone, combining many features with a decreased price. Palm later released the Palm Treo 500v, a device similar to the Centro, which ran Windows Mobile 6.0.

=== webOS and discontinuation of Palm (2009-2011) ===
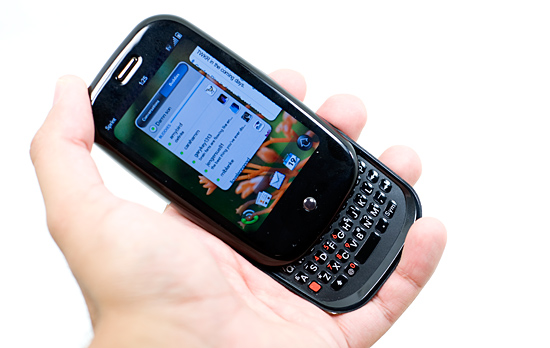
Palm Pre

Palm's focus following the Zire and Tungsten PDA lines shifted exclusively to smartphones, where the Palm OS operating system as used on the Treos was becoming outdated with both the Palm OS and the Window Mobile versions making minor impact in market share when compared to those of RIM (BlackBerry) and Apple (iPhone). In order to try to change this trend, Palm had been working on a new web-based operating system (webOS), which was an embedded Linux operating system that hosts a custom user interface built on standard web browser technology and offered genuine multi-tasking capabilities through a card based concept where each application ran as a card and the use of gestures to navigate between cards and perform actions. This platform won much respect from its peers (including praise from Steve Jobs the cofounder of Apple) but was compromised by some of the shortcuts taken in the hardware for the initial webOS, and indeed Palm's final device offerings, the Palm Pre, and Palm Pixi.

Palm released improved versions of both the Pre and Pixi as the Pre Plus and Pixi Plus, which contained improved memory capacity or processor updates but did not significantly address some of the limitations of the hardware (e.g. the screen, and CPU) in comparison to other smartphones on the market at the time.

With the acquisition of Palm by HP, the next device to market was the Pre2, which did address the screen and processor issues. This was followed in 2011 by the HP Veer and the HP Pre3, the former being a compact design (the world's smallest smartphone not much bigger than a credit card on release) and the latter showing the hardware potential to compete in the demanding smartphone market, that had expanded to include Google's Android, before Leo Apotheker, then HP CEO, abruptly pulled the plug on webOS in August 2011, which caused a dip in HP share value. Apotheker was ousted from Hewlett-Packard later in the year, due in part to criticisms behind his handling of webOS. His successor, Meg Whitman, reaffirmed HP's decision to discontinue the sale and production of webOS hardware devices; Palm's legacy was later maintained by Whitman's decision to support webOS on the software side by taking steps toward open-sourcing webOS and opening it to hardware partners.

== Legacy ==
Palm devices are often remembered as "the first wildly popular handheld computers," responsible for ushering in the smartphone era.

In January 2015, TCL Corporation announced that it had acquired the rights to the Palm name, but not any Palm OS software. In 2018, a start-up backed by TCL released a new device simply called Palm (model PVG100), although in essence it bears no relation to the original Palm devices other than name. Functionally a cross between a smartphone and a wearable, the Android-based device was designed to serve as a smaller, simplified companion to a larger smartphone.

== List of Palm devices ==
This is a list of hardware designed and marketed by Palm, Inc. (not to be confused with Palm OS devices designed by licensed third-party manufacturers: see List of Palm OS devices).

=== PDAs ===
- Pilot 1000
- Pilot 5000
- PalmPilot Personal
- PalmPilot Professional
- Palm III
- Palm IIIe
- Palm IIIx
- Palm IIIxe
- Palm IIIc
- Palm V
- Palm Vx
- Palm VII
- Palm VIIx
- Palm m100
- Palm m105
- Palm m125
- Palm m130
- Palm m500
- Palm m505
- Palm m515
- Palm i705
- Tungsten E
- Tungsten E2
- Tungsten T
- Tungsten T2
- Tungsten T3
- Tungsten T5
- Tungsten W
- Tungsten C
- TX
- Zire
- Zire 21
- Z-22
- Zire 31
- Zire 71
- Zire 72
- Treo 600
- Treo 650
- Treo 700w
- Treo 680
- LifeDrive

=== Palm OS smartphones ===
- Trēo 755p
- Trēo 700p
- Trēo 680
- Trēo 650
- Centro

=== Windows Mobile OS smartphones ===
- Trēo Pro
- Trēo 800w
- Trēo 750v
- Trēo 750
- Trēo 700w
- Trēo 700wx
- Trēo 500v
- Trēo 500

=== webOS smartphones ===
- Palm Pre
- Palm Pixi
- Palm Pre Plus
- Palm Pixi Plus
- Palm Pre 2
- HP Veer
- HP Pre^{3}

== See also ==
- Palm OS — includes discussion and links to Palm OS–compatible and Palm OS
- WebOS
- List of Palm OS Devices
- PalmSource, Inc.
- Palm, Inc.
- Multimedia terminal mobile
