= Zire 31 =

2004 handheld computer by palmOne

palmOne Zire 31

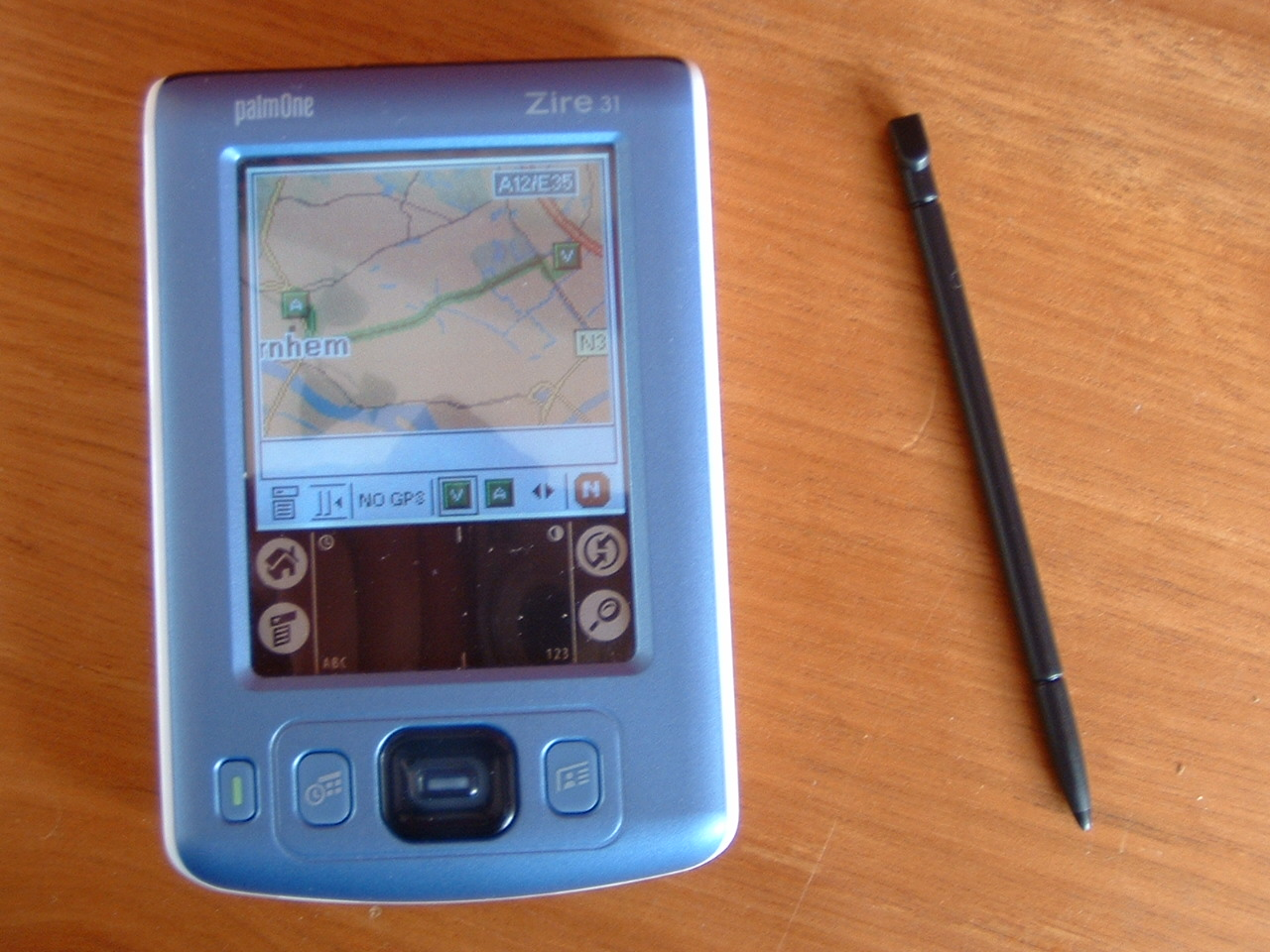
- Manufacturer: palmOne
- Type: PDA
- Lifespan: 2004-04-28
- Media: SD/SDIO/MMC slot
- Operating system: Palm OS Garnet 5.2.8
- CPU: 200 MHz Intel Xscale PXA255 Processor (ARM v5TE)
- Memory: 16 MB: 13.8 MB User + 1 MB dynamic heap
- Display: 160×160 pixel 4096 colors (12 bit) CSTN display
- Input: Graffiti 2 input zone & Touchscreen
- Connectivity: Infrared, USB
- Power: 900 mAh rechargeable built-in lithium-polymer battery
- Dimensions: 4.6 in × 3.0 in × 0.7 in (117 mm × 76 mm × 18 mm)
- Weight: 4.8 oz (136 g) handheld and stylus

The Zire 31 is a Zire Handheld from palmOne. The product was first released in April 2004 as a replacement for Zire 21. It runs Palm OS 5.2.8 and features a color 160×160 display, a SDIO slot and a standard 3.5mm stereo headphones jack. The improved PIM apps (Calendar, Contacts, Tasks and Memos) are supplied. The ROM includes RealOne Player giving the device some digital audio player capabilities. They can be extended with 3rd party software, such as TCPMP. The Zire 31 has a 5-way navigator pad, but still only 2 quickbuttons, as opposed to the standard 4 on the mid-range Zires 71/72. It was replaced by the Z22, which lacks the SD/MMC/SDIO Expansion and headphone jack.

== Specifications ==
Processor	200 MHz Intel Xscale PXA255 Processor (ARM v5TE) 200 MHz
Memory	16 MB RAM (13.8 MB actual storage + 1 MB heap)
Battery	Rechargeable lithium-polymer 900mAh battery
Operating System	Palm OS v5.2.8
Size	4.6 in. / 11.2 cm h × 3.0 in. / 7.4 cm w × 0.7 in. / 1.6 cm thickness in.
Weight	4.8 oz. / 136.1 grams (handheld + stylus)
Display	160×160 pixel 4096 colors (12 bit) CSTN Display
Expansion	1 GB max SD, SDIO and MMC support via built-in expansion card slot. (SDHC support available via 3rd party software)
Audio	3.5mm headphone jack, monophonic speaker
Beaming	IrDA (infrared)

== See also ==
- Zire Handheld
- List of Palm OS devices
