= PalmPilot =

Handheld personal information manager

Palm-Pilot
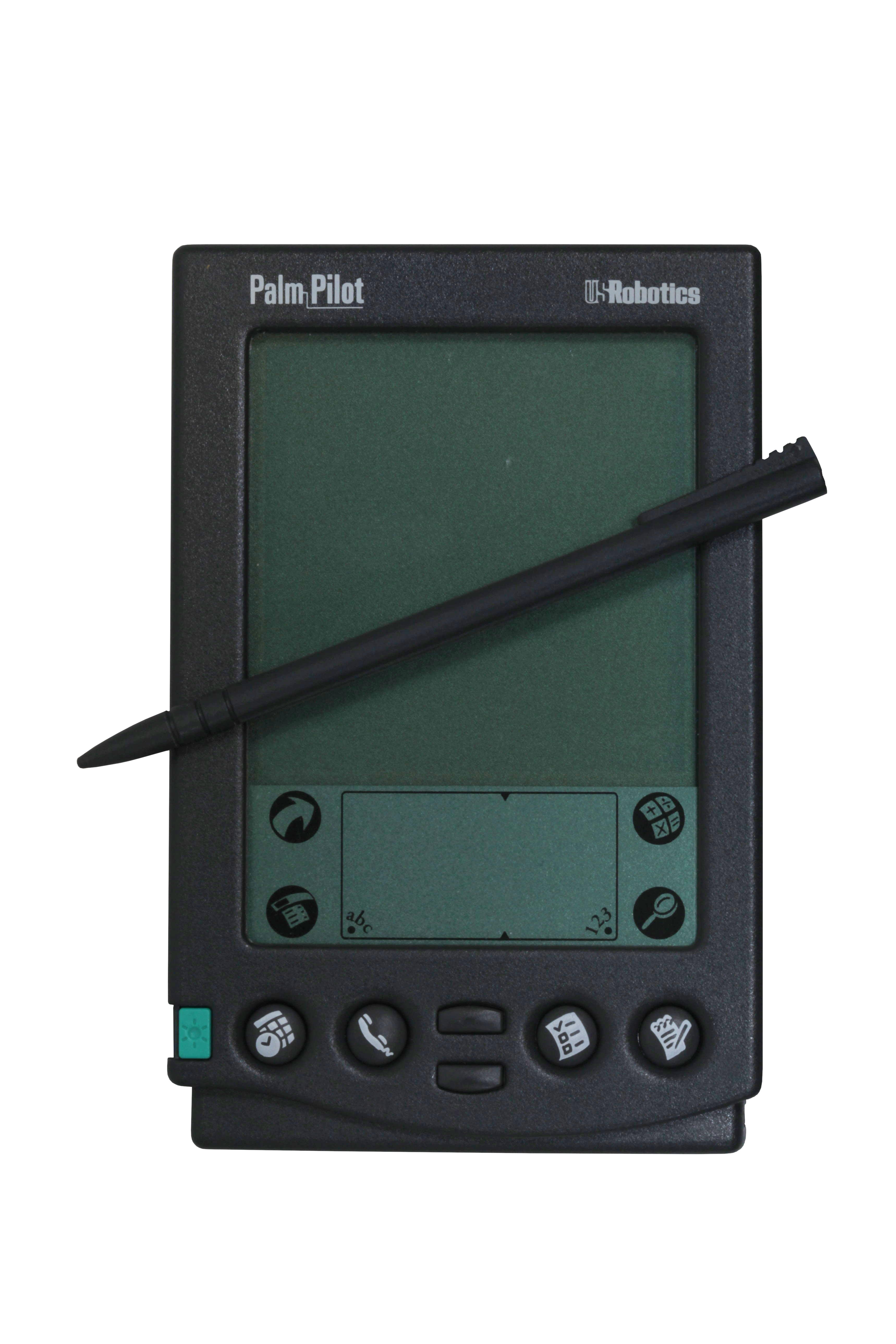
- PalmPilot with stylus
- Manufacturer: Palm Inc (then a subsidiary of USRobotics)
- Type: Bar PDA
- Released: March 10, 1997
- Operating system: Palm OS 2.0
- CPU: Motorola 68328 processor at 16 MHz
- Memory: 512 KB (Personal) or 1024 KB (Professional) built in
- Display: 160x160 pixel monochrome touchscreen LCD
- Sound: Mono loudspeakers
- Input: Graffiti input zone
- Camera: None
- Connectivity: Palm Desktop software through RS-232
- Power: 2x AAA Batteries
- Dimensions: 4.7 x 3.1 x .7 inches
- Weight: 5.6 oz (160 g)
- Related: Palm (PDA)

The PalmPilot Personal and PalmPilot Professional are the second generation of Palm PDA devices produced by Palm Inc (then a subsidiary of USRobotics, later 3Com). These devices were launched on March 10, 1997. It is a handheld electronic organiser.

== Accessories and pricing ==
Palm also sold the 10201U modem at 14.4 kbit/s, introduced at a price of $129 (this modem is also compatible with the Palm III and Palm IIIx devices). An upgrade kit was also available, which allowed users of the earlier Pilot 1000/5000 devices to upgrade the OS, ROM, and RAM to match the PalmPilot Professional. Initially suggested retail prices upon launch were $399 for the PalmPilot Professional (1 MB), $299 for the PalmPilot Personal (512 KB), and $199 for the Upgrade Kit. Upgrade kits were also available to existing registered Pilot users for $99 for a limited time after the launch. These kits included IR capability, a new plastic memory door to accommodate the IR diodes, a memory card with 1 MB, the new ROM for Palm OS 2.0, and a CD-ROM with updated desktop software.

== Reception ==
The PalmPilot became a large success and helped Palm further establish itself as the leader in the growing PDA/handheld PC market. PalmPilot had reportedly sold over 1 million units by 1998.

It was succeeded by Palm III in 1998.

== Notable uses ==
IMAX used a simulator that mimics the look and feel of a PalmPilot for its Quick Turn Reel Units (to keep it simple and familiar for IMAX film projectionists), which are used to screen feature films in 70mm.

== See also ==
- Apple Newton
- Tandy Zoomer
- iPAQ
- Jornada (PDA)
