= IIIE =

IIIE may refer to:

- Indian Institution of Industrial Engineering
- Dassault Mirage IIIE, a French fighter aircraft
- Horten H.IIIe, a German experimental glider
- Palm IIIe, a PDA
- Titan IIIE, a rocket

== See also ==
- Ille
