= Z22 =

Z22 may refer to:

- Z22 (computer), the seventh computer model developed by Konrad Zuse
- Z22 (handheld), a Palm, Inc.'s handheld model
- German destroyer Z22 Anton Schmitt, a Type 1936 destroyer built for the Kriegsmarine in the late 1930s
