= Palm i705 =

Palm OS personal digital assistant

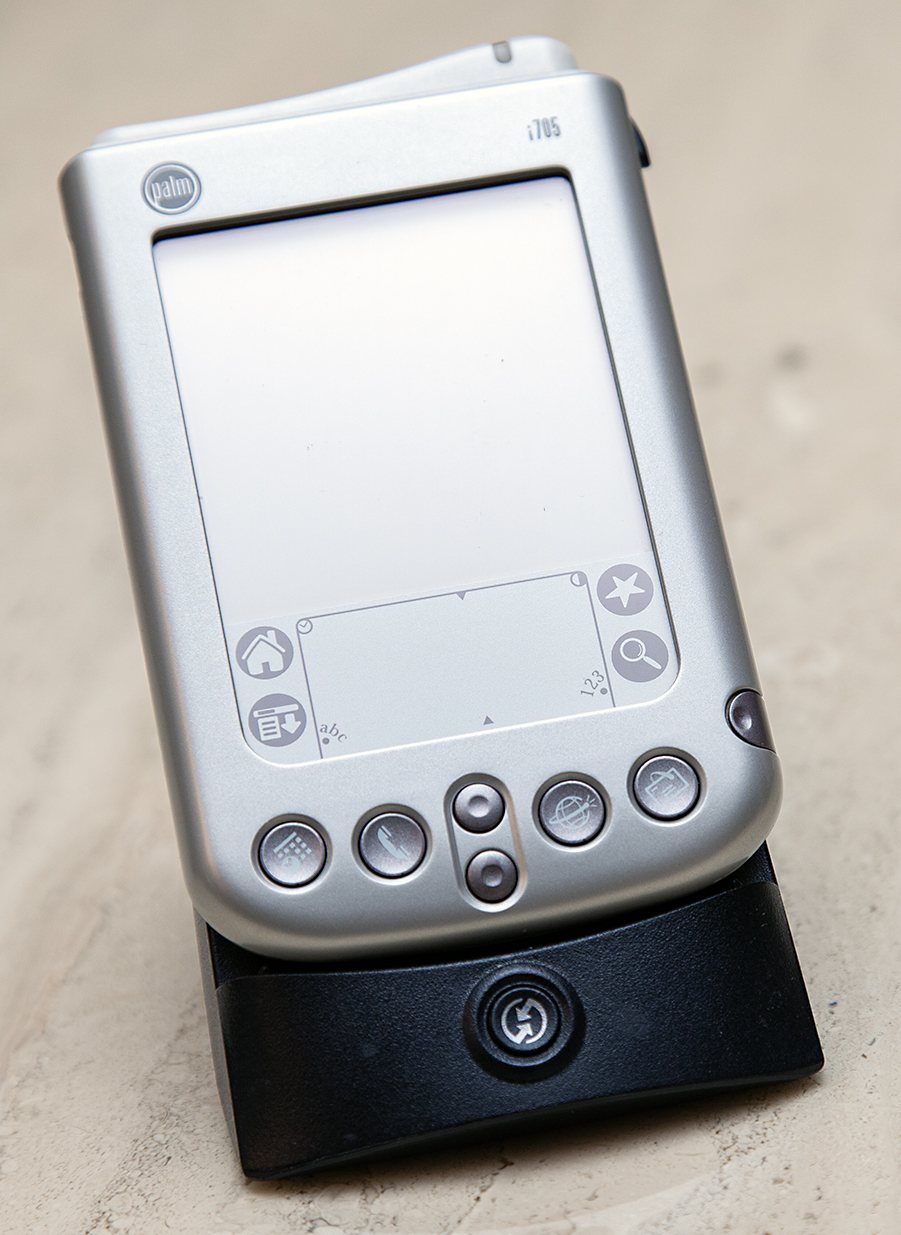
- Palm i705 in a docking cradle
- Manufacturer: Palm, Inc.
- Type: Bar PDA
- Released: January 2002
- Operating system: Palm OS 4.1
- CPU: Motorola MC68VZ328 33 MHz
- Memory: 4 MB ROM
- Storage: 8 MB Flash RAM, SD card/MultiMediaCard slot
- Display: 3" 160x160 px backlit monochrome STN, 16-grayscale LCD touchscreen
- Sound: Mono loudspeaker
- Input: Touchscreen
- Camera: None
- Connectivity: Palm.net service via Mobitex, IrDA, RS-232, USB 1.1
- Power: Lithium-ion rechargeable batteries
- Dimensions: 77.5 mm x 118 mm x 15.5 mm
- Weight: 168 g (5.9 oz)
- Related: Palm VII, Palm VIIx

The Palm i705 is an upgrade from the last series of Palm PDAs to use the now discontinued Palm.net service via Mobitex to access the World Wide Web from Palm devices. It features 8MB of onboard memory and an SD/MMC slot for additional storage or SDIO cards. It uses the Motorola Dragonball VZ 33 MHz processor and runs Palm OS 4.1. It was noted as being the first Palm.net capable device without a flip out antenna and with an internal rechargeable battery, although it is the third and final of the three models manufactured by Palm that are capable of utilizing this network.

== See also ==
- Palm.net
- Palm (PDA)
- Palm OS
- PalmSource, Inc.
- Palm, Inc.
- Graffiti (Palm OS)
