= Multimedia terminal mobile =

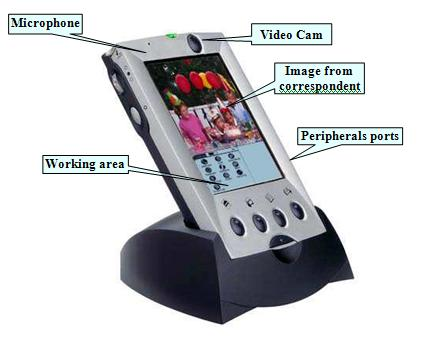
MTM prototype model

The first integration between mobile phone and Palm (PDA Personal Device Assistant) occurred in 1999, as a result of an Italian–lead project submitted to the action line V1.1 CPA1 "Integrated application platforms and services" 5th Framework Program of the European Community (project number IST1999-11100). The project, called MTM (Multimedia Terminal Mobile), was a multimedia platform, including both phone and PDA features; it also integrated the first miniature camera and a unidirectional microphone for video conferencing and commands interpretation through voice recognition. The creator and coordinator of the project, Alessandro Pappa, worked in a team with other European partners:

- PointerCom
- Sirius Communication NV
- Sistemas Expertos SA
- Matla System
- University of Avignon – LIA
- Comune di Roma – Eurolaboratorio
- DKFZ-MBI, Div. Medical and Biological Informatics, German Cancer Research Center
- TZMI, Steinbeis-Transferzentrum Medizinische Informatik
- Universidad Politécnica de Madrid
- Clinica Femenia
- Clinica Nuestra senora del Rosario

It was one of the larger projects accepted by the EC in terms of cost and numbers of project participants. It received a no refundable loan for more than 50% of the investments. The MTM formed the basis of other international projects and started the video broadband communication technology.

== Project goals ==
The major objectives of the MTM project were to:

- Introduce a new generation of communication in the millennium 2000: through a mobile terminal, making phone calls using the new high bandwidth transmission technology and at the same time being able to see the other person in video conference.
- Create an object capable of connecting to broadband for telephony and for Internet, with WEB navigation emailing, etc. Basically, having the office in your pocket.

== The project in brief ==
The MTM project has created a Hardware platform, and four vertical applications: Easy City Guide, Distance Learning, Telemedicine and Speech and Speaker Recognition.

- Easy City Guide is a guided tour with photos and voice assistant serving as a guide to museum and historical sites
- Distance Learning is a set of documents shown on a Specimen layout via the MTM in support of technical staff involved in service and maintenance.
- Telemedicine allows a remote retrieval of three-dimensional CT scans, images rotation and zooming in real time through an operator interface to hospital server and medical equips in speakerphone.
- Speech and Speaker Recognition can recognize the person who asked for a command request through biometric voice recognition. This application is designed for data security and it works transversally to the other applications.

The MTM team introduced the wireless transmission for MTM in 1999, right when the new UMTS technology came out. Although there weren't worldwide network infrastructures yet (they were expected to be available not before year 2002) the MTM team used the 802.11 connection to verify the operation with the server of CHILI (www.chili-radiology.com/de/). CHILI developed a new generation of teleradiology software, where it is possible to see the three-dimensional CT scan and do remote diagnostics to the patient at once.

Many other services and applications have been studied using the MTM. Only some of these applications and services have been so far developed on other technologies such as Smartphones. Although many large companies had worked years before to develop advanced mobile phone and PDA devices [see Nokia 9000 Communicator], none has reached MTM for integration between telephony, video, computer and broadband transmission. The new communication, audio and visual, set the background for a vast array of possible services, of interest to both professional and personal use.

== MTM technical features ==
Feature	Specifications
Wireless Transmission	UMTS GSM module WCDMAx
Loudspeaker	Incorporated
Video Camera	Incorporated
Microphone	Incorporated with noise filter
Data PC Transmission	IRDA interface 115 k baud or higher
Line Powered	6 VDC
High Speed Communications	From 150 kbit/s to 2 Mbit/s maximum
RAM	From 16 Mb to 32 Mb
Downloadable Application SW	Flash memory
Graphical SVGA display	LCD color touch screen 240x320 pixel
Voice recorder controller	~ 5 minutes
Internet	Email reading and writing, browser
RS-232 Data Port	Serial communication through a PC interface
Operating System	Linux
Dimension	Around 7 x 4,5 x 0.5 inc.

== Notes ==
flutemultimedia.in
