= Z22 (handheld) =

Handheld PDA by Palm, Inc.

Palm Z22
- Manufacturer: Palm
- Type: PDA
- Lifespan: 2005
- Media: Flash memory
- Operating system: Palm OS Garnet 5.4.9 (not upgradable)
- CPU: 200 MHz Samsung S3C2410 ARM920T-based processor
- Memory: 32 MB NVRAM (20 MB available to user, 4 MB dynamic heap)
- Display: 160x160 STN screen capable of displaying 4,096 colors (12 bit)
- Input: Touchscreen
- Camera: N/A
- Connectivity: Infrared, USB
- Power: Rechargeable lithium-ion battery

The Z22 is one of the first Palm, Inc. handhelds to be released under the new "Palm" brand, and the first to be released without the "Zire" moniker. Released on October 12, 2005, it replaced the monochrome Zire 21, and was priced at $99 USD. The Palm Z22 comes with Palm OS Garnet 5.4.9 preloaded and is not upgradable. It features a 200 MHz Samsung S3C2410 ARM processor developed around the 32-bit ARM920T core that implements the ARMv4T architecture. The Z22 runs on a li-ion battery that has a life of about 8 hours depending on usage.

== Overview ==
Designed to be attractive to first-time users, the Palm Z22 includes many of the basic applications made famous by the iconic Palm family of handheld PDAs. Positioned as an entry-level PDA and priced below the $100 price mark it lacks pricy extras such as: a camera, an MP3 player, an expansion SD memory slot, etc.

It includes a wall charger and a USB cable to trickle-charge through the USB interface when connected to a PC (so the wall-socket charger can be left at home). The Non-Volatile File System (NVFS), also known as NVRAM, ensures that data is never lost even if the battery was fully discharged.

== Software ==
The Z22 can run most of the basic programs included in previous Palm PDAs including:

1. Contacts
2. Calculator (Calc)
3. Tasks
4. Calendar
5. Note Pad
6. Memos
7. World Clock
8. Photos
9. Prefs
10. HotSync

The Z22 comes with a program called Addit which allows users to order software while offline, and then have it sent to the handheld at the next hotsync. In addition, Addit includes several mini-programs within itself including

1. Chess
2. Solitaire
3. First Aid (basic first aid instructions)
4. Check Split (a bill-splitting program)
5. Carbs (a carbohydrate nutritional calculator)

Third party software known to run on Z22:

- MobiReader (as example useful for dictionaries in mobi format)

== Interface ==
In addition to touchscreen interface, there are physical and silkscreen buttons that can be used to activate programs or functions. On the silkscreen there are eight buttons: four large icons and four on the edges of the silkscreen writing area. With the factory default settings the large icons activate the following functions: "home" (House Icon) takes the user to the home applications menu, "menu" (pulldown icon) activates the pulldown menu, HotSync (the two arrows icon) connected the computer and the Palm Pilot and syncs information between the two, "find" (magnifying glass icon) brings up a search dialogue which allows the user to search all files on the handheld. The four smaller buttons are at each corner of the writing area and have the following default functions: Clock (clock icon) brings up the Date and Time briefly, then reverts to the current program, Contrast (Circle icon: half black, half white) allows the user to adjust the contrast and brightness of the display, Keyboard (ABC Icon) brings up an on-screen keyboard that allowed the user to "type" using the stylus, Number Board (123 icon) brings up the keypad on-screen keyboard which is used in much the same way as the letters keyboard.

== Additional Hardware ==
The Z22 accepts input from numerous IR devices including other Palm handhelds, some cell phones and a keyboard made by palm for IR devices. This device is called a Palm Universal Wireless Keyboard.

The IR interface can also be used to HotSync instead of using the USB cable. In addition to HotSync the Palm also has a standard IR interface command called ‘Beam’. This command is used to send files to another IR enabled device. The ‘Beam’ function uses default IR protocols. The Palm can receive non-standard files using the IR beam method; e.g. files that cannot be transferred by using the HotSync method.

== Software with desktop computer ==
The provided software allows synchronization up to the 32-bit version of Windows Vista. Synchronization on 64-bit systems are possible with a driver released by Aceeca.
