= Palm VII =

Personal digital assistant

- The Palm VII Connected Organizer
- Manufacturer: Palm Computing, a division of 3Com
- Type: Bar PDA
- Released: May 1999; 27 years ago
- Operating system: Palm OS 3.2
- CPU: Motorola DragonBall EZ MC68EZ328 16 MHz
- Storage: 2 MB RAM
- Display: 160x160 px backlit monochrome STN, 16-grayscale LCD touchscreen
- Input: Touchscreen
- Camera: None
- Connectivity: Palm.net service via Mobitex, IrDA, RS-232
- Power: 2x AAA Batteries
- Dimensions: 5.25" x 3.25" x 0.75"
- Weight: 6.7 oz (190 g)
- Related: Palm VIIx, Palm i705

The Palm VII was a personal digital assistant made by the Palm Computing division of 3Com. The device featured an antenna used for wireless data communication, a first for a Palm device. Connectivity was provided through the Mobitex network, under the now defunct Palm.net service. Web Clipping applications, also known as Palm Query Applications (PQAs) made use of the network to request and post web data. The devices also provided PQA developers with the user's position, in the form of a zipcode, making the Palm VII the first web-enabled Location-Based Services mobile platform. The cost of service was $14.95 per month, and allowed a limited number of web pages to be viewed.

The Palm VII was the most expensive Palm sold to date, with unit pricing starting at US$599. Despite the high price tag, the Palm VII proved popular as one of the first truly wireless data-capable information devices.
