= PalmPilot Professional =

Handheld personal information manager

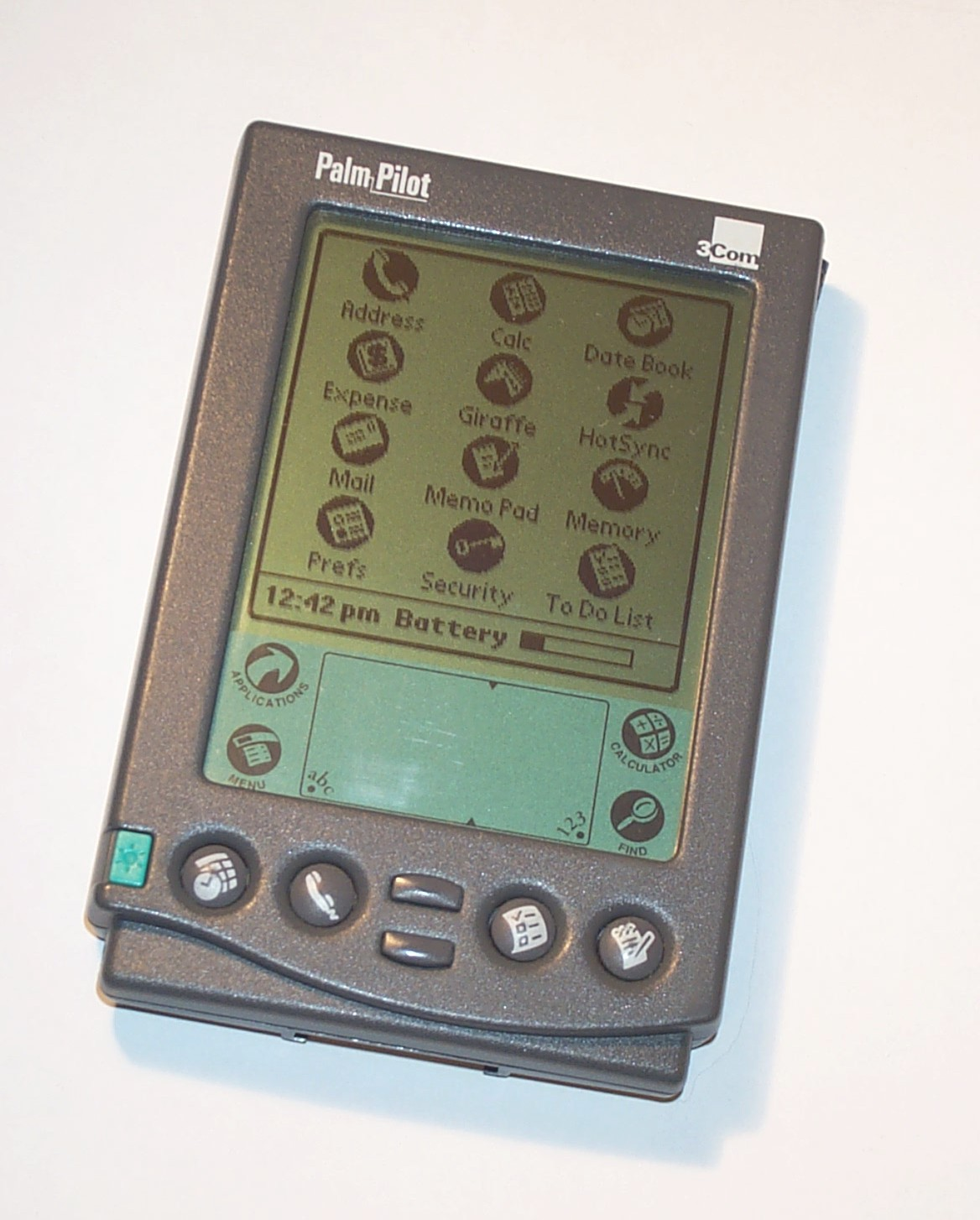
PalmPilot Professional

The PalmPilot Professional is a personal digital assistant. While the PalmPilot was released March 10, 1997 as an updated version of the Pilot 5000, there was delayed general availability of the Professional model in the marketplace.

It was marketed with a compact design, a back-lit display and the ability to quickly connect to a Microsoft Windows or Macintosh personal computer. It has the ability to synchronize via its cradle (or through a modem, which was sold separately) to a computer, making it possible to send e-mails, set appointments with others, and set contact information. Various third party applications, such as upIRC, enabled connecting to various messaging systems, including most popular instant messaging services. An optional memory card with an IR port was available as an upgrade directly from Palm.

== System Details ==
- Operating System: Palm OS 2.0, upgradeable to Palm OS 2.0.5 with 1MB or Palm OS 3.0 if 2MB memory upgrade is installed.
- Processor: Motorola MC68328 DragonBall
- Internal RAM: 1 MB
- Screen Resolution: 160x160 pixels
- Battery Type: 2 AAAs
- Battery Life: 30 hours
- Size: 117 x 81 x 17 mm - 4.6 x 3.2 x 0.7 in.
- Weight: 6.0 oz (170 g)
