= Treo 700wx =

2006 smartphone model

- Manufacturer: Palm, Inc.
- Type: Smartphone
- Released: September 2006
- Media: MMC, SD
- Operating system: Windows Mobile 5.0 / 6.0
- CPU: Intel XScale PXA272 Bulverde (312 MHz, 32-bit, ARMv5TE, 0.18 μm)
- Memory: 128MB
- Display: 16-bit color 240x240 2.5 in. TFT touchscreen display
- Input: Keypad, touchscreen
- Camera: 1.3-megapixel
- Touchpad: Entire screen
- Connectivity: CDMA, Bluetooth
- Power: Removable rechargeable Li-ion battery
- Dimensions: 4.4 x 2.3 x 0.9 in.
- Predecessor: Treo 700w
- Successor: Treo 680

The Palm Treo 700wx is a smartphone offered by Sprint, Alltel and Verizon as an update to Palm's earlier release of the Verizon-only Treo 700w. It is Palm's second Windows Mobile Treo.

== Specifications ==
- Mobile phone, CDMA model with 800/1900-MHz bands, CDMA2000 1x and CDMA2000 EV-DO networks
- Intel PXA272 312 MHz processor with Intel XScale Technology
- 128 MB (63 MB user-available) non-volatile memory
- 64 MB (57.5 user-available) RAM
- Removable rechargeable lithium-ion battery (1800 mAh)
- Windows Mobile 5.0 Phone Edition 2005
- 4.4 H x 2.3 W x 0.9 D inches (11.3 cm × 5.9 cm × 2.3 cm)
- 6.3 oz. (178 grams)
- 16-bit Color 240 × 240 TFT touchscreen display
- Supports SD, SDIO and MMC expansion cards
- Built-In Bluetooth 1.2 Compliance
- 1.3-megapixel (1280×1024 resolution, JPEG) digital camera with 2x digital zoom, video camera capability (176×144pixel @ 20 fps, 3gpp, mp4, mjpeg)
- Talk time: up to 4.7 hours, standby time: up to 15 days
- No integrated Wi-Fi or GPS support (Wi-Fi card and Bluetooth GPS adapter can be purchased separately)

== Additional features ==
The 700wx comes with a standard set of Windows Mobile smartphone features such as Microsoft Exchange Active Sync push email for Microsoft Outlook and Microsoft Office Mobile, with file support for Microsoft Word, Excel, and PowerPoint. Microsoft ActiveSync is used to synchronize the phone with the user's desktop.

== See also ==
- Treo 700p - Corresponding Palm OS device.
- Treo 700w - Previous generation model
