= Pilot 1000 =

Personal digital assistant by Palm

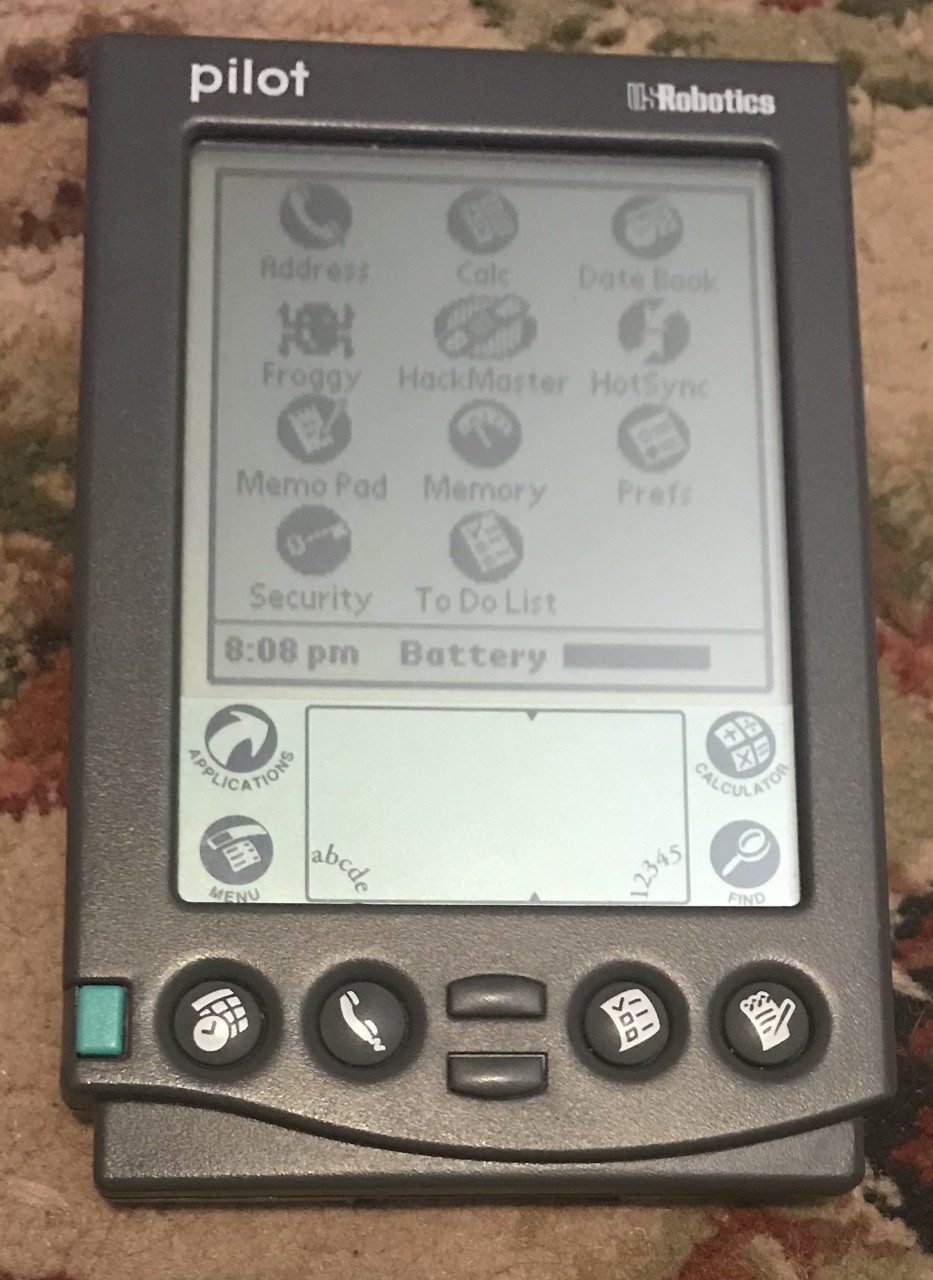
- Pilot 1000
- Manufacturer: Palm Inc (then a subsidiary of USRobotics)
- Type: Bar PDA
- Released: March 1996
- Operating system: Palm OS 1.0
- CPU: Motorola 68328 processor at 16 MHz
- Memory: 128 kB (Pilot 1000) or 512 kB (Pilot 5000) built in
- Storage: upgradable limit is 12 MB of RAM and 4 MB of ROM
- Display: 160x160 pixel monochrome touchscreen LCD
- Sound: Mono loudspeaker
- Input: Graffiti input zone
- Camera: None
- Connectivity: Palm Desktop software through RS-232
- Power: 2x AAA Batteries
- Dimensions: 120x80x18 mm
- Weight: 160 g (5.6 oz)
- Related: Palm (PDA)

The Pilot 1000 and Pilot 5000 are the first generations of PDAs produced by Palm Computing (then a subsidiary of USRobotics). It was introduced in March 1996.

The Pilot uses a Motorola 68328 processor at 16 MHz, and had 128 kB (Pilot 1000) or 512 kB (Pilot 5000) built in Random-access memory.

The PDA has a plastic case (various colors). Its dimensions are 120x80x18 mm and weight is 160 grams. The Pilot has a 160x160 pixel monochrome LCD tactile panel, with a "Graffiti input zone" presented in the bottom third of the screen. Underneath the screen sits a green on/off button, four applications buttons (Date Book, Address Book, To Do List, and Memo Pad) and two scroll buttons. At left, contrast control. At right top, stylus slot. On the back of the device there is a Memory Slot door, Reset button, battery compartment (held two AAA batteries) and Serial Port (for use with the PalmPilot Cradle).

Memory is kept in a "memory slot" under a plastic cover at the back top of the PDA. A 512 kB ROM chip stores the Palm OS 1.0 and resident applications. RAM is available in 128 kB, 512 kB or 1 MB; with a PalmPilot Professional memory card, up to 2 MB of RAM. Hardware limit is 12 MB of RAM and 4 MB of ROM.

After a calibration test presented during the initial power up, the Pilot would boot and be ready for use and synchronization. Connecting and synchronizing the PDA was initially done through a utility called Pilot Desktop. For the PC, Pilot Desktop was distributed either on 3½ inch disk or on CD-ROM (according to an original floppy disk set, v1.0 was for Windows 95 and included a tutorial disk and two win32s disks for Windows 3.1; v2.0 was for Windows 95 and Windows NT). A version of Pilot Desktop (renamed to Palm Desktop) now exists for use with the Mac platform and open source support exists for use on Linux distributions (one of the preferred development platforms for Palm OS), as well.

== Lawsuits ==
Palm, Inc. was sued by the Pilot pen company for using the name "Pilot". Palm was later involved in a legal battle where Xerox filed suit for David Goldberg's "Unistroke" patent.

Pilot 1000 & 5000 hotsync cradle

== See also ==
- Palm (PDA)
