= Enfora =

- Type: Private
- Industry: Wireless
- Founded: 1999
- Headquarters: Richardson, TX, United States
- Key people: Mark Weinzierl, CEO, Founder; Jeff Newman, Sr. VP; Robert Samra, Sr. VP
- Products: Embedded Platforms; Integrated Platforms; Gateways & Software; Services
- Website: enfora.com

Enfora was an international wireless networking company headquartered in Richardson, Texas, which was purchased by Novatel Wireless in 2010. The company was established in 1999 and was a provider of wireless networking solutions that enabled businesses to access and analyze information from geographically dispersed assets. Enfora's products consisted of embedded wireless software, wireless platforms, integrated products and enterprise software. Businesses used their products for location-based, monitoring and control, and asset management applications. It had offices in Europe, Asia and Latin America.
