= Zire 72 =

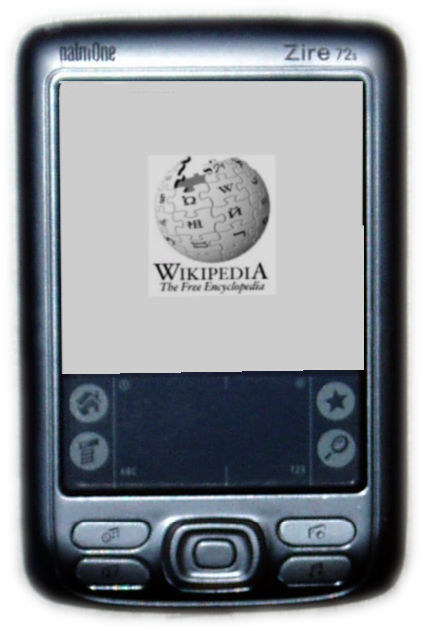
A Zire 72s handheld. The screen image is simulated from an actual screenshot from the device.

The Zire 72 is Palm, Inc.'s second Personal Digital Assistant with an integrated digital camera. Introduced in 2004, it is the replacement for the Zire 71, having a 1.2 megapixel camera, 32 MB of memory, built-in Bluetooth wireless communication, video recording and playback capability, a built-in microphone, hi-res hi-color screen, SecureDigital smartcard slot, and a 312 MHz Intel PXA270 processor.

Users have complained about several problems, most notably

- Blue paint peels off (a "special edition" version has been released that has no blue paint, just silver.)
- Camera quality (broken pixels, uncovered lens etc.)
- Screen whining
- Battery life

Palm, Inc. released a second version of the Zire 72, the Zire 72s, which is silver. This change fixed the problem with the paint. They subsequently released a version of the blue Zire 72, which used a different paint, and does not peel.

As with other Bluetooth enabled devices, turning that connectivity off when not required, extends battery life.

This is the last model in PalmOne's line of multimedia Zire devices, and the last model made with a camera. The Zire 72 has been discontinued and is no longer supported by PalmOne/Palm's successor, Hewlett-Packard.

There have also been many complaints about discolored pixels, such as certain groups of pixels on the screen turning green, red, and blue.

Specifications
Built-In Wireless	Bluetooth 1.1 Compliance
Processor	Intel PXA270 at 312 MHz with Intel XScale Technology
Memory	32MB RAM (24 MB actual storage capacity)
Battery	950mAh rechargeable Lithium Ion
Operating System	Palm OS v5.2.8
Size	4.6h × 2.95w × 0.67t in. 117h × 75w x 17t mm.
Weight	4.8 oz. / 136 grams
Display	320×320 Transflective TFT color touchscreen with 16-Bit (65K) Color
Expansion	SD, SDIO and MultiMediaCard support via built-in expansion card slot.
Audio	Stereo audio headset compatible via 3.5mm stereo audio jack - headset sold separately
Camera	Photo: 1280×960 (maximum resolution), video: 320×240 (maximum resolution)

== See also ==
- Zire Handheld
