= Palm.net =

Palm.net was a wireless data communication service enabling limited wireless access of the World Wide Web, provided for certain Palm, Inc. Personal Digital Assistants. Connectivity was provided through the Mobitex network. Web Clipping applications made use of the network to process data. The cost of service was $14.95 per month, and allowed a limited number of web pages to be viewed. The initial Palm model to be capable of using the service was the Palm VII, which made it the first standalone PDA to be capable of wireless internet access. Later models included the Palm VIIx and Palm i705. The service started in 1999 and was discontinued on August 31, 2004.
