= Palm VIIx =

Type of Palm PDA

- The Palm VIIx Connected Organizer
- Manufacturer: Palm Computing, a division of 3Com
- Type: Bar PDA
- Released: August 2000
- Operating system: Palm OS 3.5
- CPU: Motorola DragonBall EZ MC68EZ328 20 MHz
- Memory: 2 MB ROM
- Storage: 8 MB DRAM
- Display: 160x160 px backlit monochrome STN, 16-grayscale LCD touchscreen
- Sound: Mono piezoelectric loudspeaker
- Input: Touchscreen
- Camera: None
- Connectivity: Palm.net service via Mobitex, IrDA, RS-232
- Power: 2x AAA Batteries
- Dimensions: 5.25" x 3.25" x 0.75"
- Weight: 190 g (6.7 oz)
- Related: Palm VII, Palm i705

The Palm VIIx is a personal digital assistant made by Palm, Inc. The device features an antenna used for wireless data communication. Connectivity was provided through the Mobitex network under the now defunct Palm.net service. Web Clipping applications used the network to process data. The cost of service was $14.95 per month and allowed a limited number of web pages to be viewed.

The Palm VIIx succeeded the original Palm VII. It was replaced by the Palm i705.
