= Zire Handheld =

Personal digital assistant brand

The Zire Series was Palm, Inc's "consumer-grade" brand of Personal Digital Assistant.

== Background/overview ==
The lower-end models emphasized value—Palm's original Zire model was the first PDA under $100 from a major manufacturer—and the higher-end models emphasized multimedia capability, including features like cameras and audio playback functions suitable for listening to MP3s.

== Models ==
=== Palm Zire and Palm Zire 21 ===
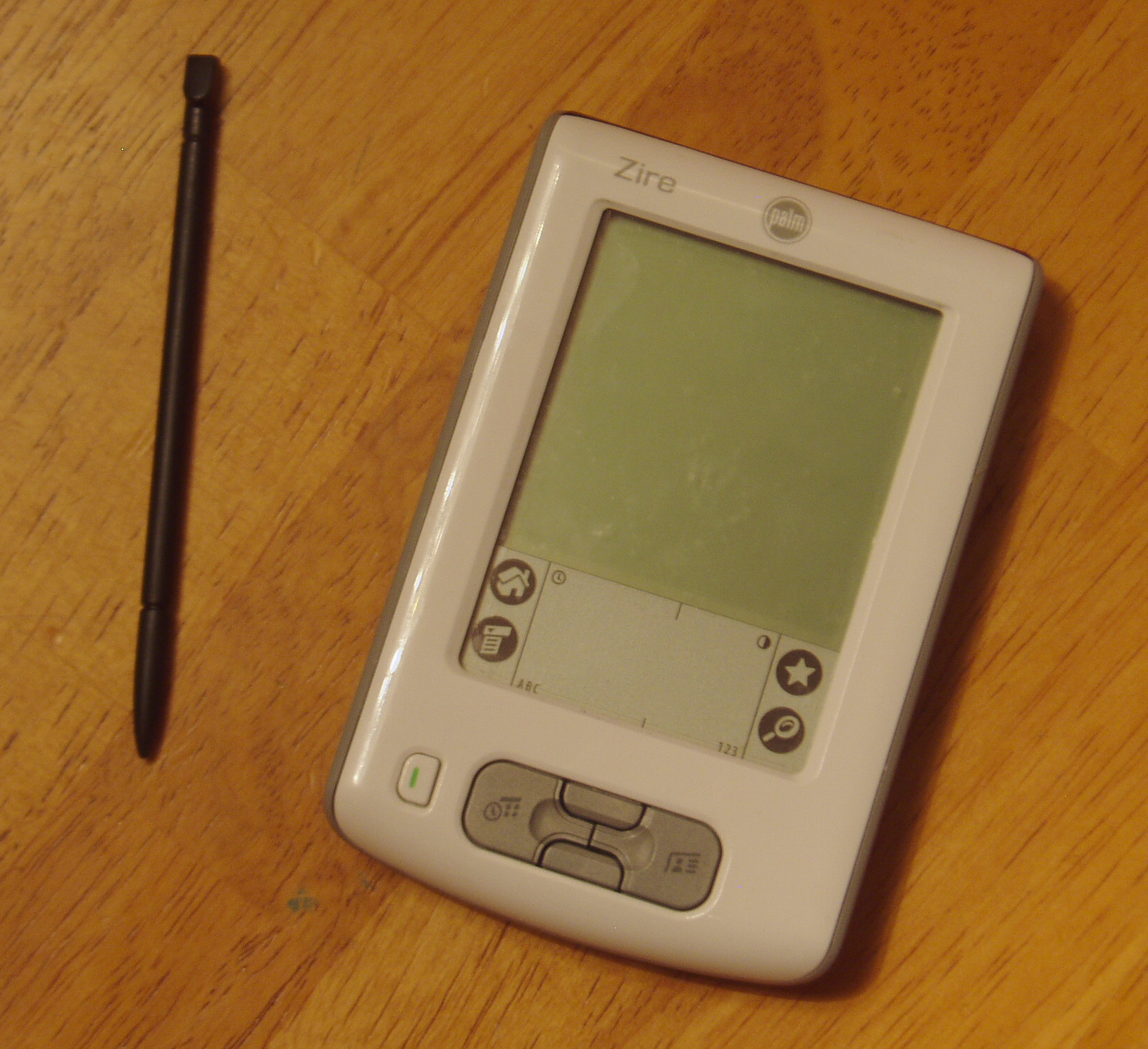
The Palm Zire

The Palm Zire and Palm Zire 21 were inexpensive and are differentiated from the rest of Palm's line by having monochrome screens without backlighting, having only two application buttons instead of the typical four, and traditional up/down scroll buttons instead of the then-standard 5-way navigator found in other models. Both of these entry-level models are lightweight (3.8oz or 108g) and sport a white plastic face with a matte gray plastic back.

The Zire (also known as the m150), released in the fourth quarter of 2002 and is the handheld responsible for starting the value-conscious handheld craze. It sported only 2 MB RAM, a 16 MHz Motorola DragonBall EZ processor, and Palm OS 4.1.x. The Zire was superseded by the Zire 21 at the release of the "First Breed of PIM Plus Handhelds" in the fourth quarter of 2003.

The Zire 21, released at the same time as the Tungsten T3 and Tungsten E, sported an improved PIM suite (then-known as the Palm PIM Plus), a 126 MHz TI OMAP311 ARM-Compliant Processor, 8 MB RAM, and Palm OS 5.2.1.

Neither the Zire nor the Zire 21 had SD/SDIO/MMC expansion, which caused the devices to be shunned by handheld aficionados. As of August 2005, both of these handhelds had been discontinued, making the Palm Zire 31 the entry-level Palm-branded PDA citing a strong demand for color.

The Zire 21 was capable of displaying PDF files using the free Adobe Reader for Palm OS version 3. Like most Palm handhelds, text from the PDF file could be copied and pasted into other applications such as Memo Pad, greatly enhancing the utility of this cheap device. It was capable of, in effect, acting as a portable word processor, albeit a very basic one.

=== Palm Zire 31 ===
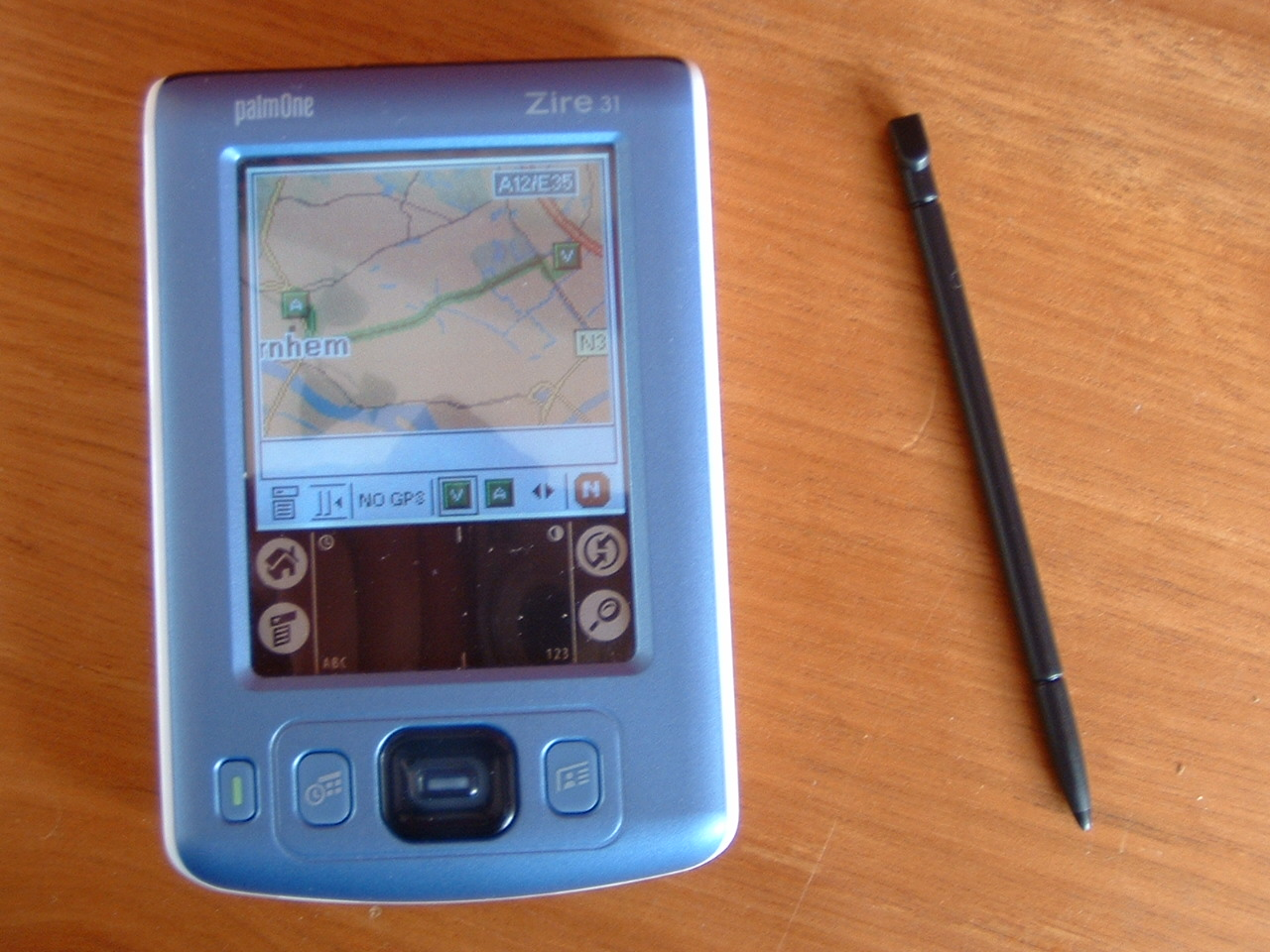
PalmOne Zire 31 and stylus

The Palm Zire 31 was a budget multimedia-oriented device. While the display was still 160×160, it was now color. The Zire 31 had twice the RAM of the Zire 21 (16 MB, 13.8 MB usable), a 200 MHz Intel XScale PXA255 processor, an SD/SDIO/MMC expansion slot, Palm OS 5.2.8, a 3.5mm stereo headphone jack and a 5-way navigator, though the Zire 31 still retained the two application buttons, as opposed to the standard four on most other models. The ROM included RealOne Player giving the device some digital audio player capabilities and a photo album application. It didn't have a direct successor—the newer Palm Z22 was more akin to the Zire 21, albeit having the same 160×160 pixel CSTN 4096-color display as the Zire 31. While Zire 31 had the ability to play video (video player not included), the experience was limited by the maximum SD/MMC card size limit (1 GB, larger cards including SDHC are possible via 3rd party software), the poor screen resolution, color depth and passive matrix display technology.

=== Palm Z22 ===
The Z22 was a successor of Zire 21, but the "Zire" moniker was dropped. Released October 12, 2005, it was available for US$149.95 as of July 2010. It had a CSTN 4096 color 160×160 display and featured 32 MB NVRAM (20 MB available to user) using NVFS, a Samsung 200 MHz processor, and Palm OS Garnet 5.4 operating system. It weighed 3.4 oz (96 g). Included in the box were cables for syncing with a computer via USB and for charging from a wall outlet, Palm Desktop software for Mac and Windows, and a screen protector.

=== Palm Zire 71 ===
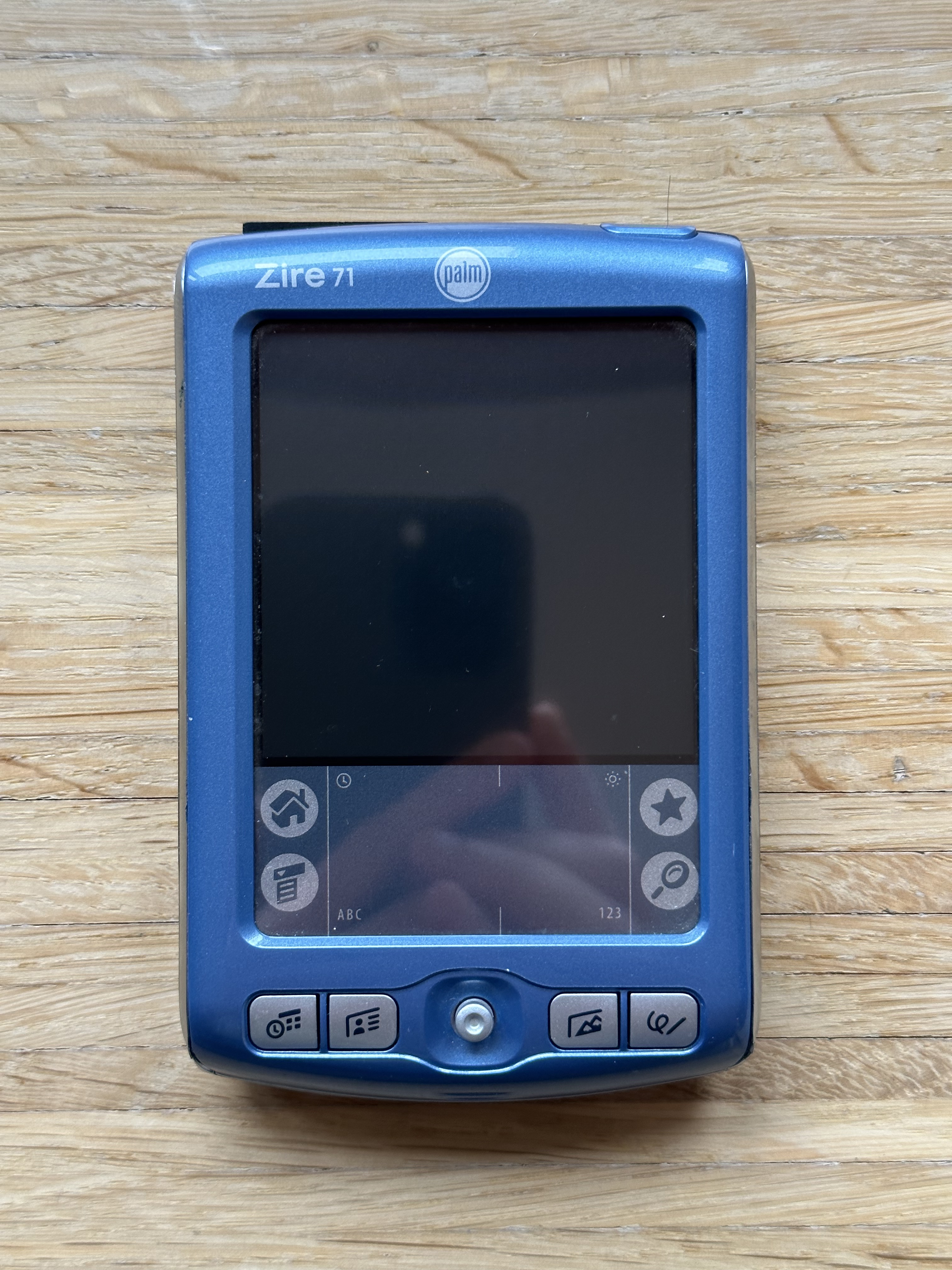
Palm Zire 71

The Palm Zire 71 was Palm's first attempt at a PDA with a built-in digital camera. It was introduced on April 23, 2003. At the time of its release, the Zire 71 was the highest-end model in the Zire line, sporting a 144 MHz TI OMAP310 processor, 16 MB of RAM (13 MB usable), 320×320 TFT 16-Bit color screen, Palm OS 5.2.1, and a VGA-quality camera (300K pixel with 640×480 support). It also featured a small joystick for navigation, a departure from both the scroll buttons and 5-way navigator of other models. Audio playback capability was possible with the inclusion of a SD card slot and a Palm version of RealPlayer. To counter the slow file transfer rate for uploading songs to the device, Palm offered an MP3 playback kit that included a memory card writer. Its introduction price was $299, but later was reduced to $249 shortly before it was replaced by the Zire 72. The 71 still had some advantages over the 72, as the camera was constantly protected by a shell on the 71, and it retained the Palm "Universal Connector" that was being phased out.

Picture taken with the Palm Zire 71

The Zire 71 did not ship with any wireless capabilities other than its infrared port. Wi-Fi capability could be added to the Zire 71 via the SD slot. Only one Wi-Fi/SD card, SanDisk model SDWSDB-000-A10M, was reported to work with Zire 71. Wireless capabilities could also be added through the use of a folding portfolio, such as the Enfora Wireless LAN Portfolio.

Reviewers were impressed by the excellent quality of its LCD and the comparatively good quality of its camera relative to similar generation VGA digital cameras.

Certain users found issues with the sensitivity of the device's joystick, which on certain devices was prone to powering up the PDA inside pockets, bags, and other containers, thus draining the batteries. The recommended utilities for the Palm Zire 71 (and all other Palm-branded PDA users as well) addressing the in-pocket power-up problem are

- PocketProtector by Geakware;
- Power by Whizoo;
- OffAlready by Toysoft inc;
- Disable Buttons (freeware) by Pasquale Foggia.

Alternatively, one could simply lessen the frequency of this occurring by inserting the PDA into its case top first (so that the joystick is at the wider end of the pocket). Additionally, after many cycles of opening and closing the camera, the flex-cable that connected the halves of the device could fracture. This led to the loss of charging, wired syncing and shutter button functionality as the IO connector and button resided on the back half of the device.

=== Palm Zire 72 ===
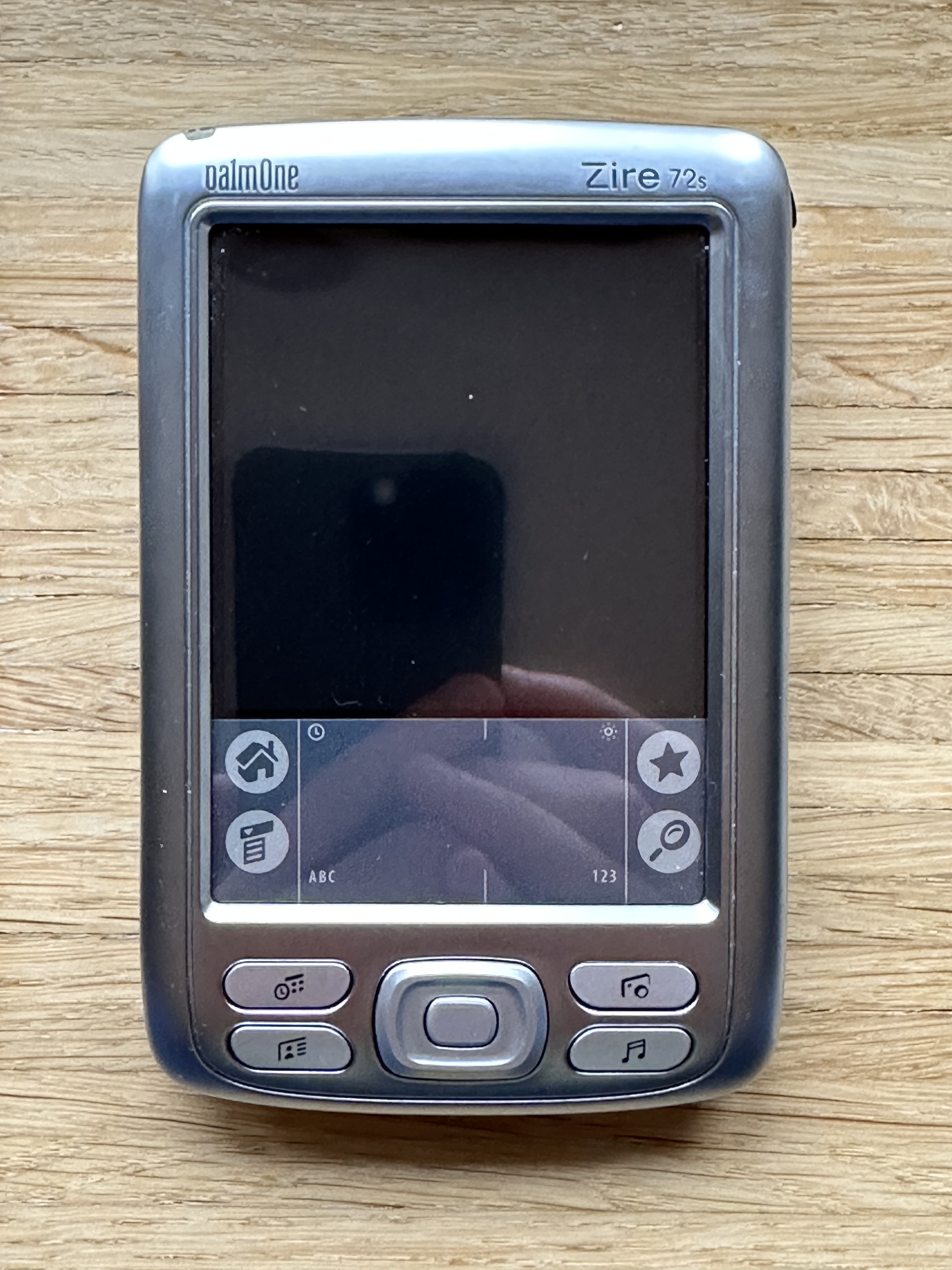
PalmOne Zire 72s

The Palm Zire 72 was the successor to the Palm Zire 71. New features included Bluetooth, voice recording, and video capture with sound. The joystick was replaced with the standard 5-way navigator similar to that of the Tungsten models, and the camera was upgraded from 0.3 to 1.2-megapixels. The Zire 72 had 32 MB of RAM (25 MB usable) instead of 16 MB, a 312 MHz Intel PXA270 Processor instead of the previous TI OMAP Processor, and weighed 4.8oz as opposed to 5.3oz for the Zire 71. This model featured the updated suite of PIM apps, like the E, T3, and Z22 models. The Zire 72 was available in two models. The standard Zire 72 had a bright blue painted body with a silver back. The Zire 72 Special Edition was an all-silver model.

The Zire 72, while it had more features than the Zire 71, was hit with a lot of criticism over time. Some users reported problems with the camera: the camera lens was not covered, the camera didn't work in low-light conditions, and broken pixels were common. (Third-party cases included a lens cover.) The screen quality, while good, was not as brilliant as the Palm Zire 71. Many users complained of the blue 'soft-touch' rubberized paint coating chipping and peeling after moderate use.

== Comparison ==
Comparison of Zire devices
Name	Zire	Zire 21	Z22	Zire 31	Zire 71	Zire 72
Weight	3.8 oz (110 g)		3.4 oz (96 g)	4.1 oz (120 g)	5.3 oz (150 g)	4.8 oz (140 g)
RAM size: total/available/Non-volatile	2/1.8 Mb/No	8/7 Mb/No	32/24.6 Mb/Yes	16/13.8 Mb/No	16/13 Mb/No	32/25 Mb/No
Storage expandable	No			Yes		
Display	LCD, b/w, 16 gray levels		STN passive matrix, color, 12 bit		TFT active matrix, color, 16 bit	
Resolution	160*160				320*320	
Processor	Motorola DragonBall EZ	TI OMAP311	Samsung S3C2410 ARM920T	Intel Xscale PXA255 (ARM v.5TE)	TI OMAP310	Intel PXA270
Processor frequency	16 MHz	126 MHz	200 MHz		144 MHz	312 MHz
Palm OS version	4.1	5.2.1	Garnet 5.4	5.2.8	5.2.1	5.2.8
PIM version	Standard		Newer		Standard	Newer
Audio output	Piezo Buzzer			Headset Jack + Speaker		
Multimedia capabilities	No			MP3 player	MP3 player, video player	
Additional features and devices	No				Camera (640*480, 0.3-megapixel, covered, photo), 5-way joystick	Camera (1280*960, 1.2-megapixel, uncovered, photo and video), microphone and voice recording capability, Bluetooth
PC Connection	Mini-USB Port				Universal Connector (with Cradle Dock)	Mini-USB Port

== See also ==
- Tungsten, Palm's brand of Business-Grade Handhelds
- Treo Series, Palm's brand of Smartphones
- LifeDrive, Palm's brand of Professional-Class Mobile Managers
