= Palm IIIe =

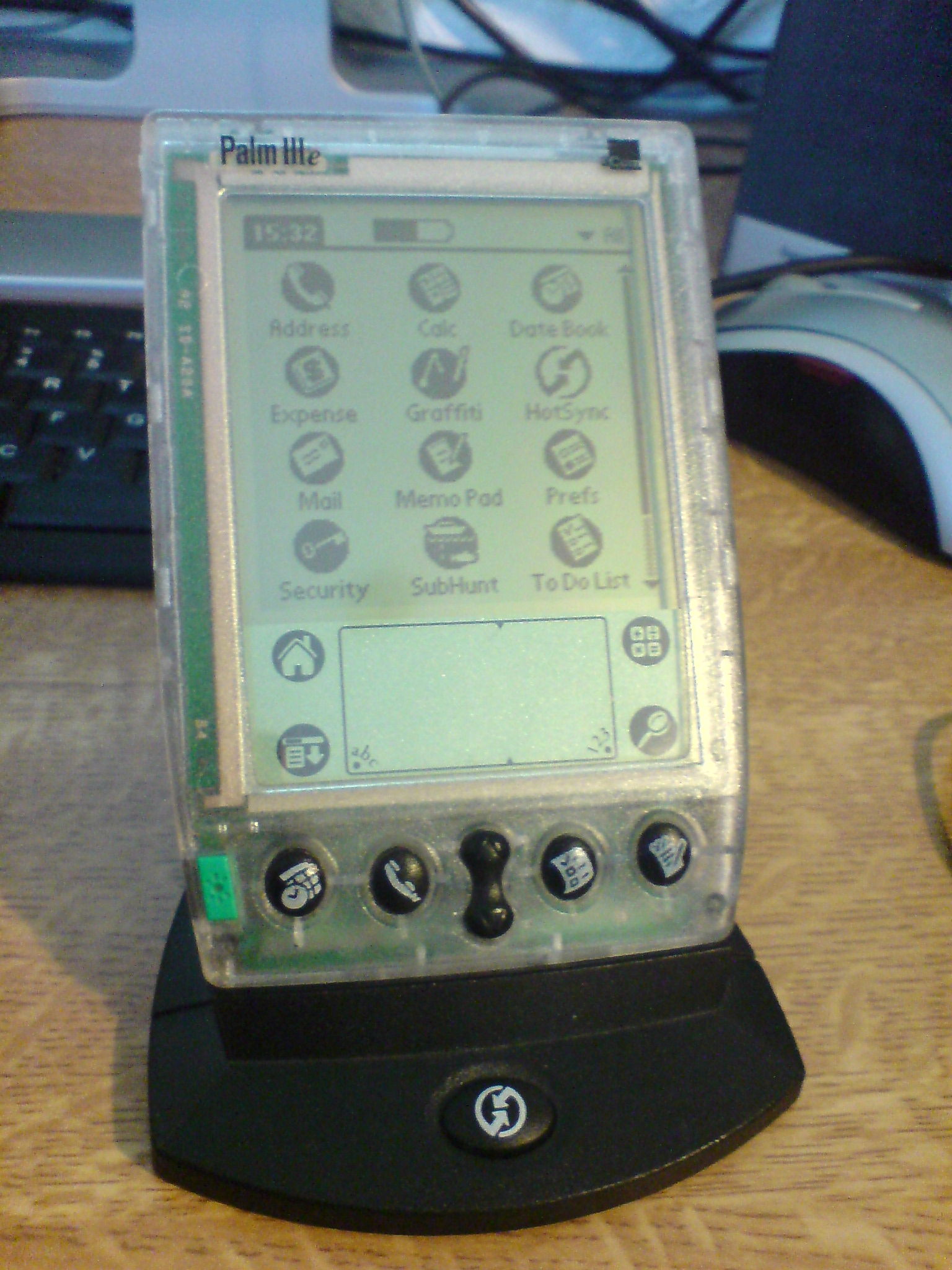
Palm IIIe Special Edition

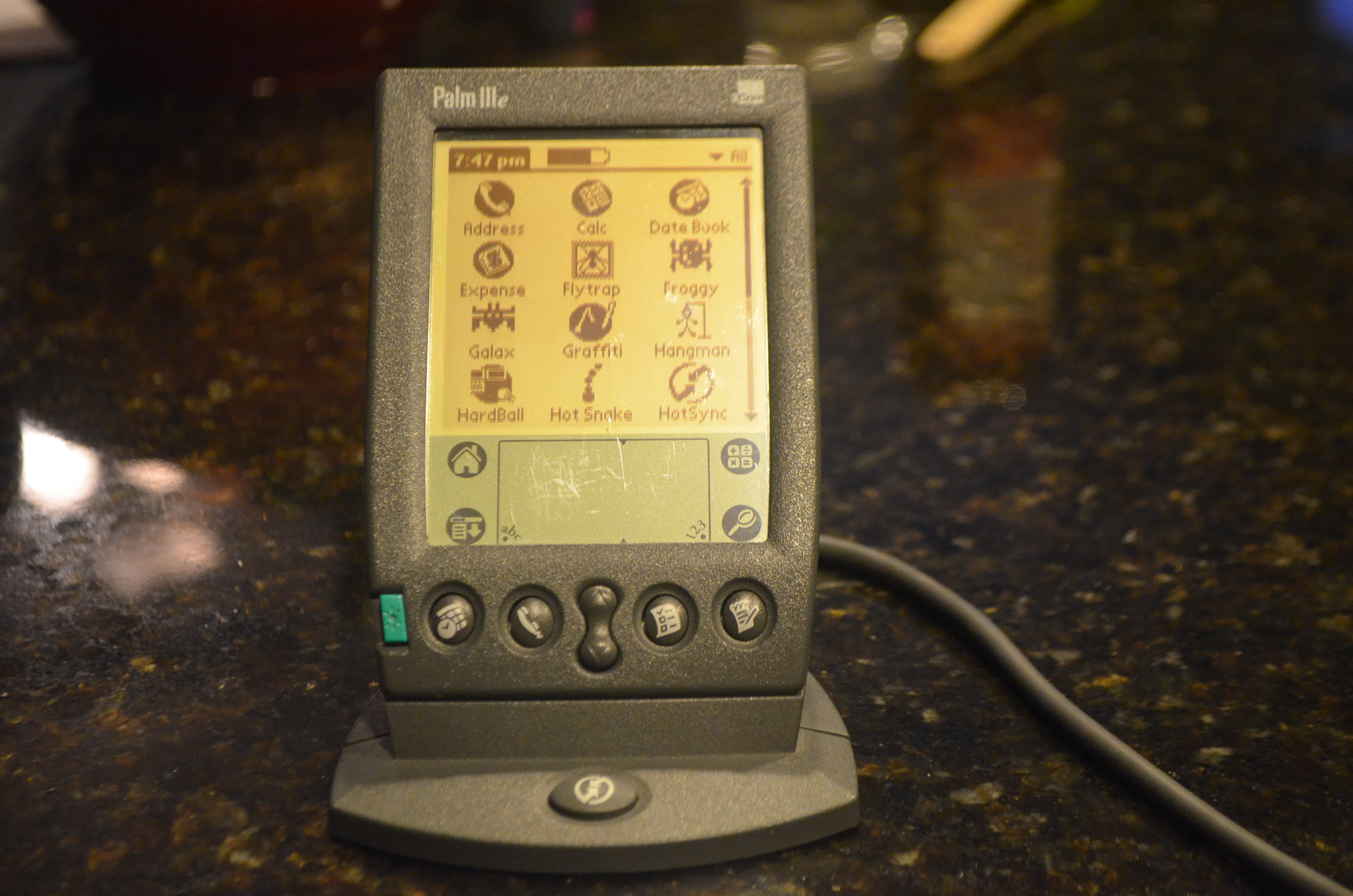
A Palm IIIe sitting in its HotSync cradle.

The Palm IIIe is a personal digital assistant (PDA) from Palm Computing released in 1999 briefly after the more expensive and more advanced Palm IIIx.

It shared the same screen as the Palm IIIx, which improved upon the Palm III's screen by featuring a new enhanced and easier to read LCD. Like the previous models, it offered 2-bit display (4 greyscales). The Palm IIIe had 2MB of RAM, which is the same as the Palm III. It had a 16 MHz Motorola DragonBall EZ CPU, said to be faster and more efficient than the 16 MHz Motorola DragonBall CPU found in all previous Palm models.

The Palm IIIe featured an inverse electroluminescent backlight that illuminated the screen text instead of the screen background. This same feature was found on the Palm IIIx. This feature was an area of controversy as many people disliked it while many others found it to be an improvement.

Like the Palm IIIx, the Palm IIIe shipped with Palm OS 3.1. However, unlike the Palm IIIx, the Palm IIIe did not have an upgradeable Flash ROM, instead using a permanent ROM. As a result of this the Palm IIIe had no operating system upgrade path. The Palm IIIe was the only Palm III series model not to ship with Flash ROM.

Later a Special Edition IIIe device was released, which had a translucent clear case.

== See also ==
- List of Palm OS Devices
