= The Core Pocket Media Player =

Software media player

- Developers: Gabor Kovacs; CoreCodec.Org
- Release: 26 April 2004
- Stable release: 0.71 (November 23, 2005; 20 years ago) [±]
- Preview release: 0.72 RC1 (2006-08-03) [±]
- Written in: Assembly, C
- Operating system: Cross-platform
- Available in: 20 languages
- Type: Media player
- License: Open-source/Proprietary
- Website: TCPMP Homepage (archived with non-functional download links)

The Core Pocket Media Player (TCPMP) is a software media player which operates on portable devices and Windows-based PCs. It is discontinued, but still available from the official mirror site. Supported operating systems include Palm OS, Symbian OS, and Microsoft Windows, CE, and Mobile. It is also available on Microsoft's Zune HD via a hack called Liberate. TCPMP also has hardware accelerated playback for ATI and Intel 2700G mobiles, such as the Tapwave Zodiac and Dell Axim X50v/X51V.

Development of the free version of the software was discontinued by CoreCodec in favour of the commercially licensed CorePlayer, though TCPMP is still regarded as one of the more versatile media players for PocketPC and Palm OS mobile devices.

== History ==
According to the CoreCodec.com website as of September 2002, the development team planned to continue development and releases of the open source version of the player "offsite"; this code would also be incorporated into the commercial player. In 2004, on CoreCodec.org, the open source player was released as BetaPlayer 0.01a for Windows CE and Windows Mobile. It was renamed The Core Pocket Media Player in July 2005 upon its release for the Palm OS and Windows CE/Mobile operating systems. A release of TCPMP for the Symbian OS has been remarked upon, but further information about it is available only in forums.

The TCPMP project page indicates that the development languages used were "assembly, C". In 2006, CoreCodec Inc. discontinued development of TCPMP to focus on the commercial CorePlayer Platform.

== Codecs ==
TCPMP supports many audio, video, and image formats, including AC3, HE-AAC (later removed), AMR, DivX, FLAC, H.263, H.264, JPEG, Monkey's Audio, MJPEG, MPEG-1, MP2, MP3, Musepack, MS-MPEG4-v3, PNG, Speex, TIFF, TTA, Vorbis, WAV, WavPack and XviD. It supports many container formats, including 3GP, ASF, AVI, Matroska, MPEG, OGG, OGM and QuickTime.

On the Windows desktop platform, a third-party codec can support H.264, and a third-party plugin can support YouTube videos and other Flash video formats.

== Reception ==
The program received consistently positive reviews for its performance, versatility, and functionality, with minor criticism of user interface issues. HPC:Factor magazine, in evaluating version 0.66, declared it "excellent" while noting a need for improvement in menu space usage, and the "complete lack of documentation." Version 0.70 was described as "the best, free multimedia player for both the Pocket PC and the Palm OS platform" in Smartphone & Pocket PC magazine in November 2005. The 2006 Treo Central review gave it a score of 4/5 for use on Palm OS-equipped Treo devices, with "a pretty cool and logical interface, albeit with some drawbacks", "supporting almost every video encapsulation known to humankind" without conversion prior to playback. SmartDevice Central reviewed version 0.71 on the Palm Treo 700 in 2007, called it "impressive", and "a solid piece of software," while summarizing its user interface as resembling "a black-and-white Macintosh app from the late 1980s, it has absolutely no eye candy whatsoever."

After CoreCodec Inc. discontinued development of TCPMP in 2006, renamed it CorePlayer, and developed it for commercial sale, one review referred to the "quirky but rock solid TCPMP" as "bulletproof", compared to a very early version of the new player (later reviews mentioned no problems with stability).

== See also ==
- CorePlayer
