= XPG =

The acronym XPG can refer to the following:

- xpg, ISO 639-3 code for the Phrygian language
- XPG, IATA airport code for railway station Gare du Nord, Paris
- XPG ("Xtreme Performance Gear"), the gaming hardware and accessories product line of the Taiwanese memory and storage manufacturer ADATA
- X/Open Portability Guide, which specifies the requirements for any system which is intended to be a Unix system, and a predecessor to the POSIX standard
- Xeroderma pigmentosum, complementation group G, a genetic disorder and a possible source of skin tumors
- an endonuclease involved in nucleotide excision repair
