= Sundaresh =

Sundaresh can be both a masculine given name and a surname. Notable people with the name include:

- Sundaresh Menon, Singaporean lawyer and judge
- Sushant Sundaresh, winner of the 2008 Intel International Science and Engineering Fair
- S. "Sundi" Sundaresh, engineering executive
