= SandForce =

American semiconductor company

- Type: Subsidiary
- Industry: Solid-state storage
- Founded: 2006
- Founder: Alex Naqvi and Rado Danilak
- Headquarters: Milpitas, California, U.S.
- Area served: Worldwide
- Key people: Michael Raam, CEO
- Products: Solid-state drive controller
- Number of employees: 190
- Parent: Seagate Technology
- Website: www.sandforce.com

SandForce was an American fabless semiconductor company based in Milpitas, California, that designed flash memory controllers for solid-state drives (SSDs). On January 4, 2012, SandForce was acquired by LSI Corporation and became the Flash Components Division of LSI. LSI was subsequently acquired by Avago Technologies on May 6, 2014 and on the 29th of that same month Seagate Technology announced its intention to buy LSI's Flash Components Division.

SandForce was founded in 2006 by Alex Naqvi and Rado Danilak. In April 2009, it announced its entrance into the solid-state drive market.

SandForce did not sell complete solid-state drives, but rather flash memory controllers, called SSD processors, to partners who then built and sold complete SSDs to manufacturers, corporations, and end-users. However, another division of LSI used the SandForce SSD processor in the LSI Nytro PCIe product line. Zsolt Kerekes, an SSD Market Analyst and publisher of StorageSearch.com, said in 2011 that SandForce was the best-known maker of SSD controllers.

== History ==
Alex Naqvi and Rado Danilak had experience from companies including Marvell, Intel Corporation, NVIDIA, Toshiba, and SanDisk when they started SandForce. At the end of 2009, it had approximately 100 employees.

SandForce was initially financed by private equity firms Storm Ventures, Doll Capital Management (DCM), and unnamed computer data storage firms. By April 2009, SandForce had taken in more than $20 million in two venture rounds. In November that same year they closed a series C funding round of $21 million led by TransLink Capital and included LSI, ADATA, and others, including Seagate Technology. Finally in October 2010, SandForce closed a series D round of $25 million led by Canaan Partners and included the existing investors.

The board of directors included Carl Amdahl (General Partner at DCM and son of Gene Amdahl), Ryan Floyd (Storm Ventures), S. "Sundi" Sundaresh (former President and CEO of Adaptec), Jackie Yang (managing director at TransLink Capital), and Eric Young (Canaan Partners). C.S. Park, a Seagate board member and also a former chief executive at Maxtor and former chief executive at Hynix was also on the board until sometime before mid 2011.

On October 26, 2011, LSI Corporation announced the intent to acquire SandForce and by January 4, 2012, the deal was finalized with SandForce becoming the new Flash Components Division of LSI led by Michael Raam. On December 16, 2013, Avago Technologies announced its intent to acquire LSI and the deal was completed on May 6, 2014. On May 29, 2014, Seagate Technology announced it had entered into an agreement with Avago to purchase LSI's Flash Components Division.

== Technology ==
SandForce uses inexpensive multi-level cell technology in a data center environment with a 5-year expected life. At the time the company emerged from stealth mode, other solid-state drives in the market were using the more expensive single-level cell technology.

SandForce gave the name "DuraClass" to the overall technology incorporated in its controllers. SandForce controllers did not use DRAM for caching which reduces cost and complexity compared to other SSD controllers. SandForce controllers also use a proprietary compression system to minimize the amount of data actually written to non-volatile memory (the "write amplification") which increases speed and lifetime for most data (known as "DuraWrite"). SandForce claims to have reduced write amplification to 0.5 on a typical workload. As a byproduct, data that cannot readily be compressed (for example random data, encrypted files or partitions, compressed files, or many common audio and video file formats) is slower to write. Other features include error detection and correction technology known as "RAISE" (Redundant Array of Independent Silicon Elements) which improves the disk failure rates, and AES encryption which works in the background and is completely automatic. Data is encrypted even if there is no password which makes data recovery problematic; however, hardware encryption (which encrypts the user data as physically stored to flash without any significant performance loss) doesn't replace, but rather complements, the drive lock feature and software-based encryption, which prevent unauthorized access to the drive's contents over the host interface.

== Products ==
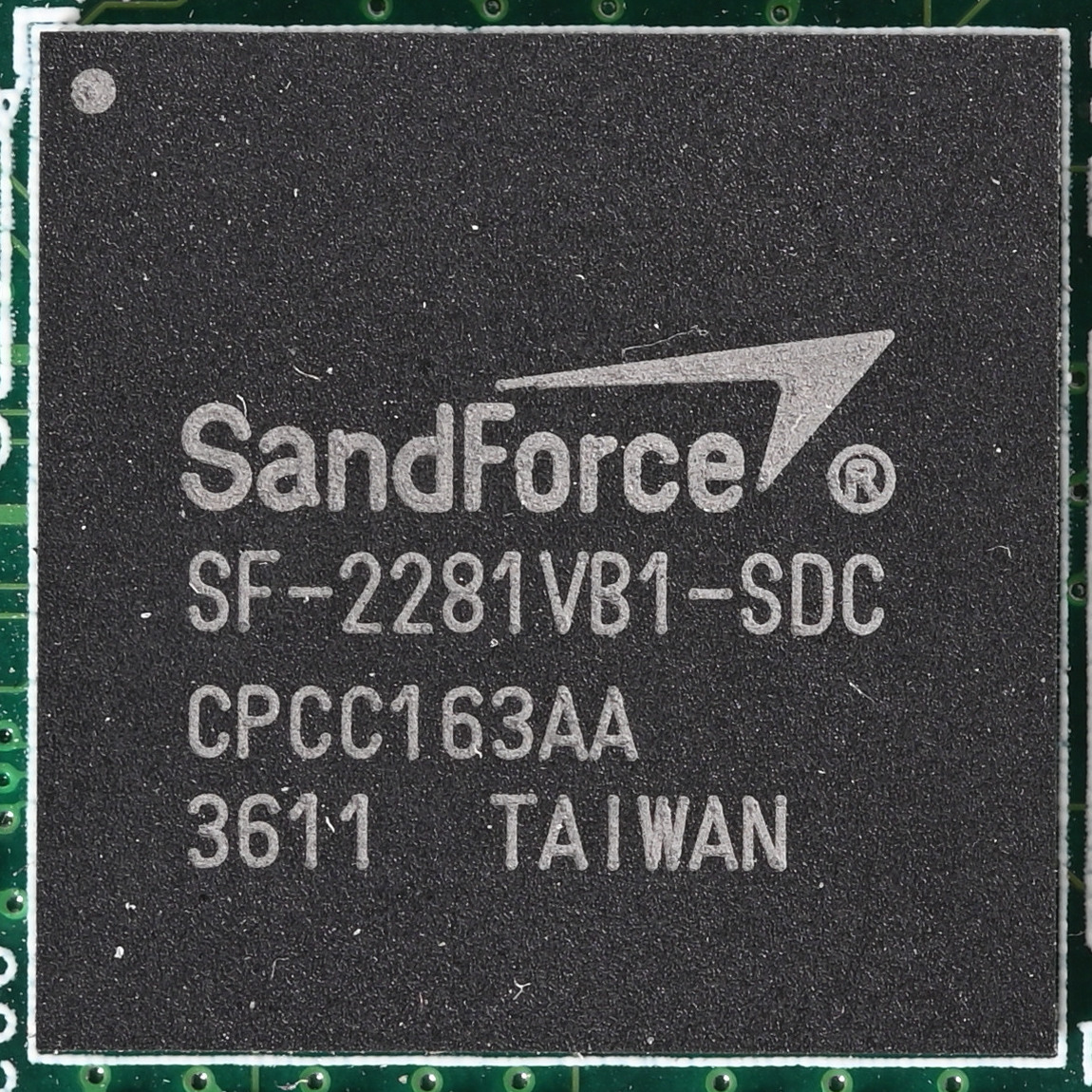
SandForce SF-2281 Controller

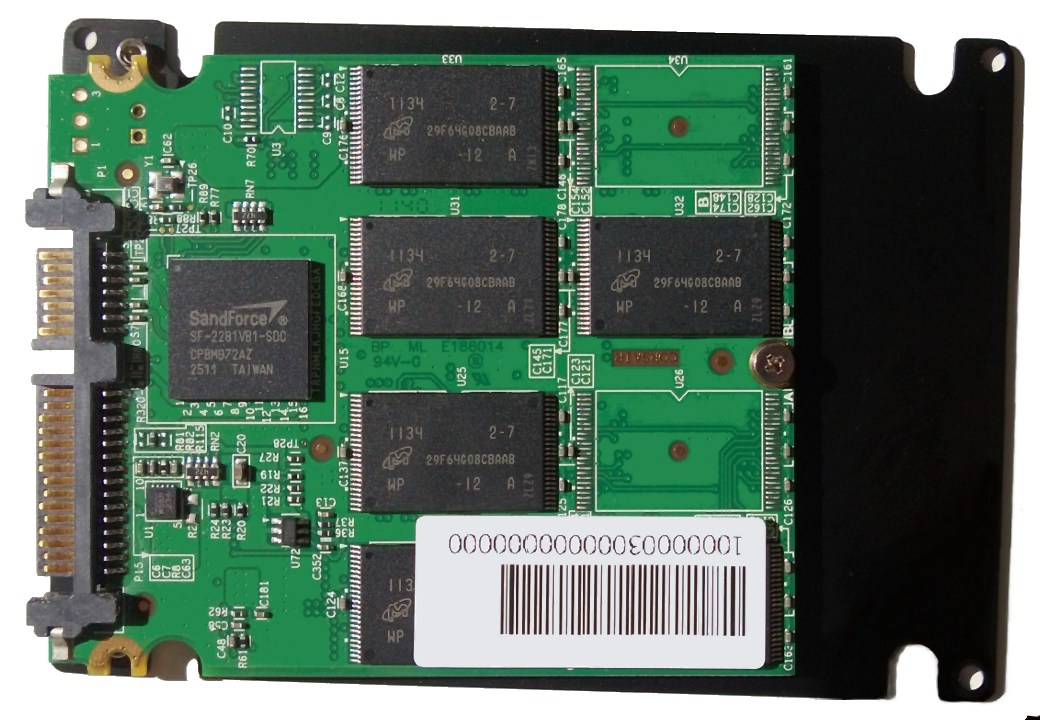
SSD with SandForce SF-2281 Controller

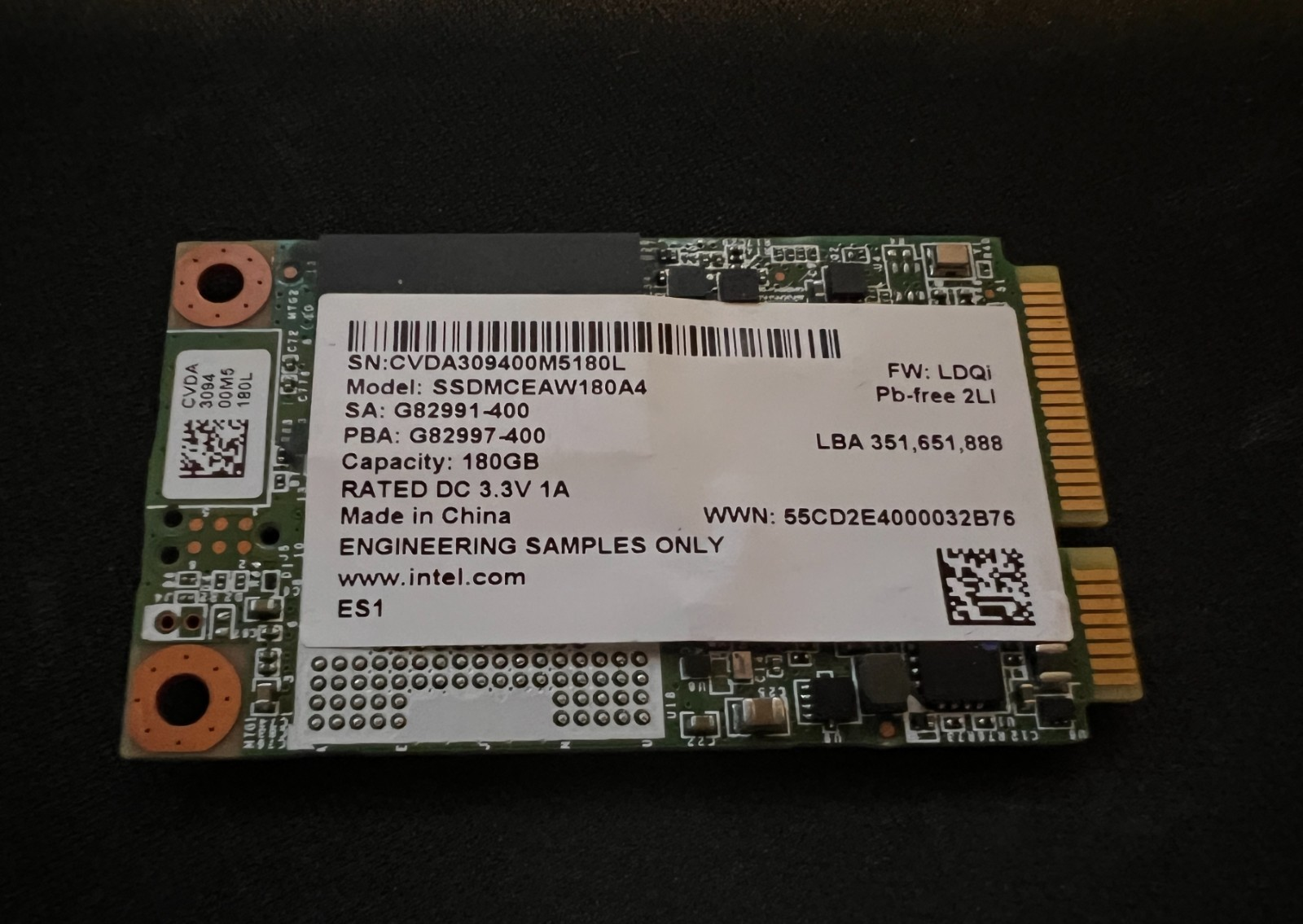
mSATA SSD with SandForce SF-2281 Controller (Intel 525 mSATA SSD)

SandForce initially released a family split into enterprise (data center) and client (desktop) computing applications. The SF-1500 was the enterprise product and the SF-1200 the client product. Reference designs included information to build and sell a complete product. In October 2010, SandForce introduced its second-generation SSD controllers called the SF-2000 family focused on enterprise applications. Enhancements included: SATA 3.0 (6 Gbit/s), faster speeds, security, and data protection features. The client version of this second generation line was introduced in February 2011 with most of the same enhancements seen in the SF-2500.

Announced in November 2013, the SF 3700 family of controllers supported triple-level cell flash for higher capacity and NVM Express for improved performance at the high end. Sample engineering boards with the PCIe x4 (gen 2) model of this controller found 1,800 MB/sec read/write sequential speeds and 150K/80K random IOPS. A Kingston HyperX "prosumer" product using this controller was showcased at the Consumer Electronics Show 2014 and promised similar performance. Mushkin also showcased products using the SF 3700 series at CES, highlighting its M.2 Helix series up to 480 GB (512 GiB) and up to 2 TB in for the 2.5 inch format.

The SF 3700 family consists of:

- SF3719 — SATA 6 Gbit/s + x2 PCIe; "entry level" product with identical connectivity but announced to have fewer firmware features than the "mainstream" SF3729; precise differences in features not yet disclosed
- SF3729 — SATA 6 Gbit/s + x2 PCIe
- SF3739 — x4 PCIe (gen 2); support for optional battery or supercapacitor "full power fail" protection
- SF3759 — "full enterprise feature set" (no further details released yet)

All these models are actually made of the same die (produced in a 40 nm process), an area of which goes unused in the lower-end products. The RAISE technology in the SF 3700 series was upgraded from protecting against a single page or block failure (in the previous series) to "multiple pages and blocks or up to a full die" with the so-called RAISE level 2. Additionally, the new chips reserve less than a full die for redundancy (so-called "fractional RAISE").

== Issues ==
After the introduction of the SF-2000 series controller, some customers using drives with that controller reported issues such as BSOD and freezing. In early June 2011, Corsair Memory issued a recall on the 120 GB Force 3 with specific serial numbers, but not on any other Force 3 drive with a SandForce SF-2000 controller. Therefore, that recall does not appear to be related to the controller. In October 2011, SandForce sent out firmware updates through its manufacturing partners such as OCZ that fixed the reported issue. In August 2012, TweakTown identified an issue with SandForce-based SSDs using firmware 5.0.1 and 5.0.2 wherein TRIM support did not perform optimally when fully erasing the SSD, but also confirmed that the 5.0.3 and 5.0.4 firmware resolved the issue.

In 2012, SandForce SF-2000-based drives were discovered to only include AES-128 encryption instead of the advertised AES-256 encryption. It was speculated the lower grade encryption was used to qualify for US ITAR licences which are precluded for products featuring certain levels of encryption heading for a selected list of US-ambivalent or actively unfriendly countries. Products such as Kingston SSDNow V+200 and KC100 were re-documented to state the use of 128-bit AES encryption. Intel offered refunds for affected users of Intel 520 Series SSDs until January 1, 2012, while Kingston offered exchange program to cover the cost of shipping for customers who request a swap.

== Marketing programs ==
SandForce Driven logo

In May 2010, SandForce introduced the "SandForce Driven" program. The "Intel Inside" program and the BASF advertising slogan that said "We don't make the things you use, we make the things you use better" are similar examples of companies promoting a component inside the end product. SandForce created a logo that partners can display on the SSD or their advertising to indicate a SandForce controller is inside and uses a SandForce-written firmware. In October 2013, there were 38 members of the SandForce Driven program.

SandForce Trusted logo

SandForce created the "SandForce Trusted" program in January 2011, which identified approved vendors that provide equipment, tools, and services compatible with SandForce SSD Processors. It is a form of approved vendor list that helps SSD OEMs and manufacturers get a higher level of service and support.
