= Dell Axim =

Series of PDAs released between 2002 and 2007

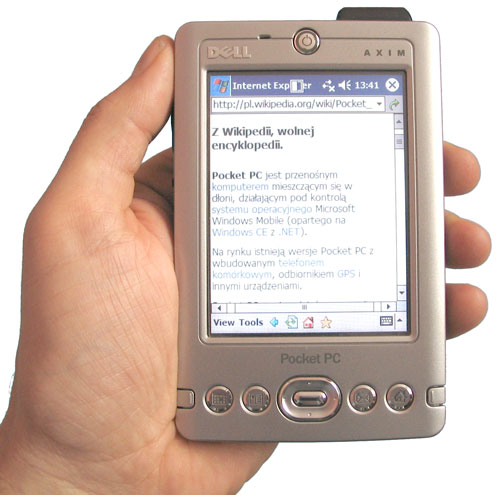
Dell Axim

The Dell Axim family of personal digital assistants was Dell's line of Windows Mobile-powered Pocket PC Devices. The first model, the Axim X5, was introduced in 2002, while the final model, the Axim X51, was discontinued on April 9, 2007.

== Background ==
=== X5 family ===
Dell entered the personal digital assistant (PDA) market in 2002 with the debut of the Axim X5. The base-level Axim X5 had a 300 MHz Intel XScale PXA250 processor, 32 MB RAM, 32 MB flash ROM, a Type II CompactFlash slot, an SD/MMC slot, a 16-bit QVGA (240 × 320 dots) TFT display, a speaker, a microphone, and a base price of US$279. A high-end Axim X5 came with a 400 MHz Intel XScale processor, 64 MB RAM, and 48 MB flash ROM for US$349. Early models shipped with Pocket PC 2002, but an upgrade to Windows Mobile 2003 was offered and came preinstalled on some refurbished units. Despite rumours and speculations, further versions of Windows Mobile are unsupported. However, efforts have been made to port Linux to the system. Although the Axim X5 was regarded as an affordable Windows Mobile device at the time it was released, affordability came with a size penalty: The weight was 195 g (6.9 ounces) and the size was 127 mm × 81 mm × 18 mm (5 in × 3.2 in × 0.7 in). The Axim X5 came with a rechargeable battery that would last for about 8 hours.

The Dell Axim X5 was superseded by the Dell Axim X3 and subsequently X30, a follow-up to the Dell Axim X5 boasting a more compact design and with lighter weight.

Many Dell Axim X5 units have issues with the touchscreen failing and a realignment failing as well, even after a hard reset. There is a design flaw inside the unit that causes this. The inside portion of the home button will rub against the touchscreen ribbon cable and eventually wear through the protective coating and ground out the touchscreen. The fix is to take the unit apart and put a very small piece of electrical tape over that portion of the ribbon cable. This requires removing both batteries, clearing all data from the device (similar to a hard reset) and delicate work in taking the unit completely apart.

=== X3 family ===
Dell Axim X3 was launched in October 2003, and came in three models: the Basic, Advanced and X3i which was the same as the Advanced model but added WiFi 802.11b wireless networking. All featured replaceable battery, an SD slot, fast processor and transflective liquid crystal display. Unlike the X5, the X3 didn't have a CF slot.

All three models looked the same with the exception of the X3i which had a WiFi antenna nub on the top right corner. The Basic and Advanced models varied in processor speed and amount of memory. All models had Intel XScale PXA263 processors and Intel StrataFlash ROM.

The Basic had a 300 MHz XScale processor, 31 MB of RAM and 32 MB of ROM. The Basic model came with a USB sync cable (users could purchase a cradle separately). SD slot, WiFi capability and Infrared port included.

The Advanced model had a 400 MHz XScale processor, 64 MB of RAM and 64 MB of ROM. The Axim X3i added WiFi to the Advanced model configuration. The Advanced and X3i came with a chrome finish weighted USB sync cradle that can also charge a spare battery. In all other respects, these units were identical to each other.

X3 came with a user replaceable 950 mAh lithium-ion battery, which could be replaced by an optional 1800 mA extended battery which doubled run times.

=== X30 family ===
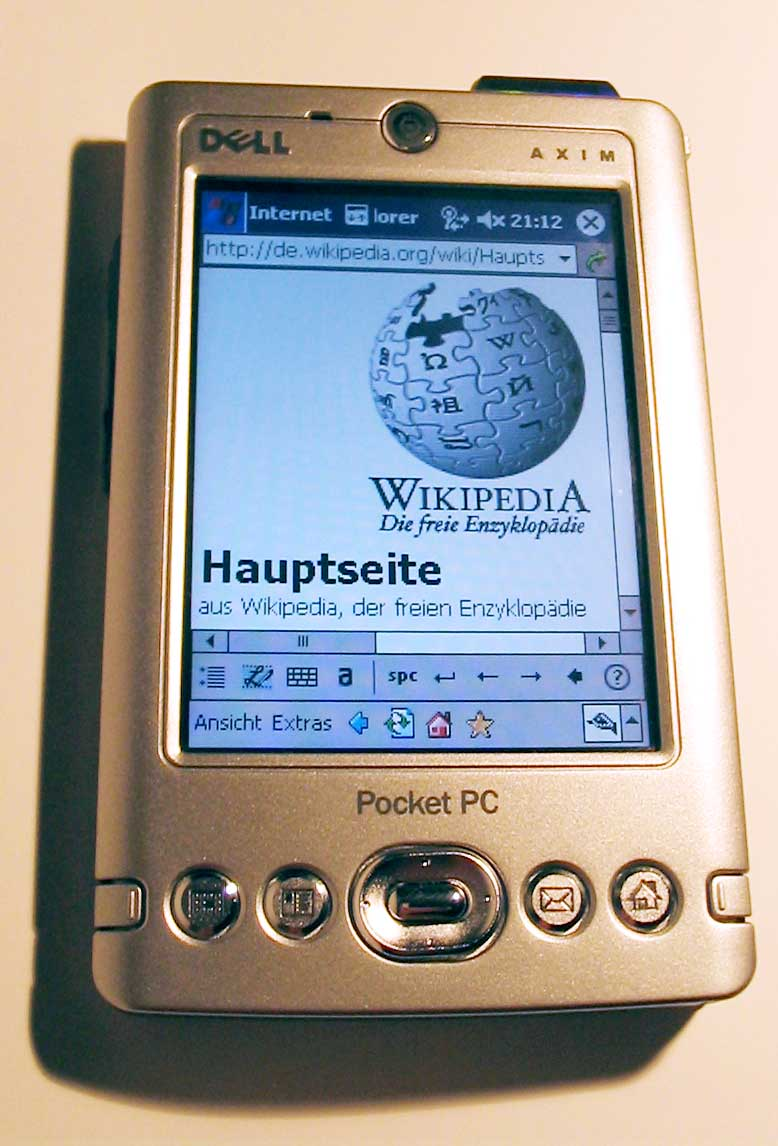
Axim X30

The Dell Axim X30 was the first Dell Pocket PC to include Windows Mobile 2003 Second Edition on all models. This was also the first Pocket PC to include the Intel XScale PXA270 processors.

The High-End X30 includes a 624 MHz processor making it the fastest Personal Digital Assistant or PDA at the time it was made. The mid-level model includes everything the High-End X30 does with the exception of the cradle, and uses a 312 MHz PXA270 processor instead. Both the high-end and mid-level models had built-in 802.11b Wi-Fi Certification, Bluetooth 1.1 compliance, 64 MB of Intel StrataFlash ROM, and 64 MB RAM, while the entry-level model had 32 MB SDRAM, 32 MB of Intel StrataFlash ROM and no wireless capabilities. All X30 models include a standard SD/MMC/SDIO slot, replaceable/rechargeable battery, a 3.5" QVGA TFT 16-Bit color display, and Windows Mobile 2003 Second Edition.

SDHC cards will not function. Only SD cards of 4 GB or less will work.

=== X50 family ===
The Dell Axim X50 family was available in three models. The X50 low-end model used an Intel XScale processor at 416 MHz, 64 MB flash ROM, and retailed for $299 USD. The mid-range model had 128 MB of flash ROM, a 520 MHz processor, and was listed at $399. The high-end device, the X50v, had a VGA screen, 624 MHz processor, 128 MB flash ROM, and retailed for $499 at the time of release. In 2005 the Dell Axim X50 series received a Red Dot Design Award as a recognition for its design.

Axim X50v
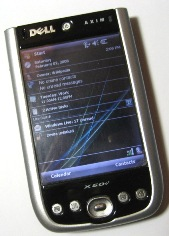
- Manufacturer: Dell
- Type: PDA
- Lifespan: 2004
- Media: Secure Digital, CompactFlash
- Operating system: Windows Mobile Classic 2003SE, 5, and 6
- CPU: 624 MHz Intel XScale PXA 270
- Display: 3.7" VGA TFT screen w/ 16-bit color
- Graphics: Intel 2700G
- Input: Touchscreen, tactile buttons
- Camera: None
- Connectivity: 802.11b Wi-Fi, Bluetooth 1.2, IrDA
- Power: Rechargeable lithium-ion battery

The Axim X50 family is a set of Pocket PCs from Dell released in 2004 . They are available in three models. Two named X50 (referred to as Low and Mid) and the high-end X50v. In 2005 X50 series received Red Dot Design Award as a recognition for its design.

=== X50v ===
The X50v retailed for $499 at the time of release. The v represented its VGA screen. The X50v remains one of the few devices to feature the Intel 2700G 3D accelerator and video decoder, along with 16 MB of video RAM. This allowed the device to render the 3D games included by Dell as well as others available at retail. The device has a built-in 128 MB Intel StrataFlash ROM and 64 MB RAM.

The X50v shipped with Windows Mobile 2003 Second Edition. The next year, Dell offered an upgrade to Windows Mobile 5. However, it was later withdrawn because users complained about slow performance. Windows Mobile 2003 stores modified files in RAM and only writes to the flash chip when the user copies files to the internal storage partition. Windows Mobile 5 changes this: it does not store files in RAM, and instead writes everything to flash memory. This prevents the loss of data when the battery is empty for long enough to clear the contents of RAM. The storage chip in the Dell Axim X50 family, however, is slow NOR flash and is not suitable for constant writes; thus, Windows Mobile 5 runs slowly on these devices. The X51 family, in comparison, has a faster flash chip and is better suited to run Windows Mobile 5.

While the X50 family has reached EOL, in mid-2007, an unofficial Windows Mobile 6 ROM for the X50v appeared. This update requires the PDA to be upgraded to WM5 and then uses the bootloader to flash a WM6 ROM image from an SD card. The update adds new features to the X50v.

Features include:

- 3.5" Quarter-VGA LCD screen with 16-Bit Color and Portrait/Landscape Support
- Built-In CompactFlash expansion slot
- Built-In Secure Digital expansion slot
- Intel PXA270 processor running at 416 MHz (Low)/ 520 MHz (Mid)
- Available Built-In 802.11b Wi-Fi Certification (X50 Mid only)
- Standard Built-In Bluetooth 1.2 Compliance
- 64 MB (Low)/ 128 MB (Mid) Intel StrataFlash ROM with 64 MB on-handheld RAM
- Windows Mobile 2003 Second Edition (Upgradeable to Windows Mobile 5.0 and Windows Mobile 6.0 with downloaded ROM Update)

The X50(Low) retailed for $299 USD and the X50(Mid) retailed for $399 at launch.

=== Firmware ===
The latest official Windows Mobile 2003 SE ROM build for the Axim is A05 (Released 8/18/05) and is located at Support.Dell.com

The latest official Windows Mobile 5 ROM build for the Axim is A02 (Released 12/27/06) and is located at Support.Dell.com

There is also an unofficial Windows Mobile 6 ROM that has been modified to run on the Axim X50v. The current revision is A03 Beta (Released 5/11/07)

There is also an unofficial Windows Mobile 6.1 ROM for Axim X50v. The current revision is A09 LennySh edition.

=== X51 family ===
The Dell Axim X51, released late September 2005, featured the same sleek design as the X50v, but replaced Windows Mobile 2003 Second Edition with Windows Mobile 5. The X51 also came with a larger ROM than the X50.

Like the X50, the X51 family came in three models. The X51 featured:

- 3.7" VGA LCD screen with 16-Bit Color and Portrait/Landscape Support (X51v only)
  - 3.7" VGA is around 2.22" x 2.96" = around 216 pixels per inch
- 3.5" Quarter-VGA LCD screen with 16-Bit Color and Portrait/Landscape Support (X51 Low & Mid)
- Intel 2700G 3D multimedia accelerator with 16 MB video RAM (X51v only)
- VGA-Out functionality (using an optional adapter cable), enabling the PDA to be connected to a monitor (X51v only)
- Built-In CompactFlash Type II expansion slot
- Built-In Secure Digital expansion slot
- Available Built-In 802.11b Wi-Fi Certification (X51 Mid & X51v only)
- Standard Built-In Bluetooth 1.2 Compliance
- Long-range IrDA interface
- Up to 256 MB Intel StrataFlash ROM with 64 MB on-board RAM
- Microsoft Windows Mobile 5.0 software with Windows Media Player 10 Mobile (Upgradeable to Windows Mobile 6.1 with a downloaded ROM update)
- RS-232 port is also included, but only supplies TTL signal level. Dell has a RS-232 cable for it though, even if it was never listed in their webshop.

The low-end X51 has an Intel XScale processor running at 416 MHz, 128 MB flash ROM, and had a list price of $299 (before being discontinued). The mid-range model also has 128 MB flash ROM, a 520 MHz processor, and retailed for $299 (from dell.com or £245.58 on www.dell.co.uk). The high-end X51v has a VGA screen, a 624 MHz processor, 256 MB flash ROM, and had a list price of $379.

As of February 17, 2007 the low-end X51 has been discontinued and is not sold by Dell anymore.

There is also an unofficial upgrade to Windows Mobile 6.1 for the X51v. Despite its unofficial status, it has been tested and had gone through several prerelease versions before being released to the general public. An unofficial upgrade to Windows Mobile 6.0 exists for the X50. Known bugs include the lack of support for CompactFlash cards.

There is or was also an attempt to design a Linux implementation (based on Kernel version 2.6) for the X50 and X51 families of Axims, but it is still in a very early stage with major hardware components and functions (such as the backlight, sound, PCMCIA/Compact Flash, Flash Memory, Wi-fi, Bluetooth and USB connectivity) inoperative.

There is a partially functional port of Google's Android operating system to the Axim X51 under the AxDroid project. The current version of the build supports the Android Froyo release.

== Specifications ==
Model	Launch year	RAM (MiB)	ROM (MiB)	Slots	CPU	MHz	Screen	OS	WiFi	Bluetooth	More
X5	2002	32	32	1CFII,1SD	Intel XScale PXA250	300	240 x 320	PPC2002/WM2003	No	No	
X5 high end	2002	64	48	1CFII,1SD	Intel XScale PXA255	400	240 x 320	PPC2002/WM2003	No	No	
X3 Basic	2003	32	32	1SD	Intel XScale PXA263	300	?	WM2003	No	No	USB sync cradle with CF, IR
X3 Advanced	2003	64	64	1SD	Intel XScale PXA263	400	?	WM2003	No	No	USB sync cradle with CF, IR, spare battery charging
X3i	2003	64	64	1SD	Intel XScale PXA263	400	?	WM2003	802.11b	No	USB sync cradle with CF, WiFi, IR, spare battery charging
X30 low-end	2004	32	32	1SD	Intel XScale PXA270	312	3.5" QVGA TFT 16-Bit	WM2003SE	No	No	
X30 mid-range	2004	64	64	1SD	Intel XScale PXA270	312	3.5" QVGA TFT 16-Bit	WM2003SE	802.11b	1.1	
X30 high-end	2004	64	64	1SD	Intel XScale PXA270	624	3.5" QVGA TFT 16-Bit	WM2003SE	802.11b	1.1	Cradle
X50 Standard	2004	64	64	1CFII,1SD	Intel XScale PXA270	416	QVGA	WM2003SE/WM5/WM6/WM6.1	No	Yes	
X50 Advanced	2004	64	128	1CFII,1SD	Intel XScale PXA270	520	QVGA	WM2003SE/WM5/WM6/WM6.1	802.11b	Yes	
X50v	2004	64	128	1CFII,1SD	Intel XScale PXA270	624	VGA	WM2003SE/WM5/WM6/WM6.1	802.11b	1.2	IrDA, RS-232 post, Intel 2700G 3D MMA w/16 MB VRAM, VGA Out
X51 low-end	2005	64	128	1CFII,1SD	Intel XScale PXA270	416	3.5" QVGA LCD 16-Bit	WM5/WM6/WM6.5	No	1.2	IrDA, RS-232 post
X51 mid-range	2005	64	128	1CFII,1SD	Intel XScale PXA270	520	3.5" QVGA LCD 16-Bit	WM5/WM6/WM6.5	802.11b	1.2	IrDA, RS-232 post
X51v	2005	64	256	1CFII,1SD	Intel XScale PXA270	624	3.7" VGA LCD 16-Bit	WM5/WM6/WM6.1/WM6.5	802.11b	1.2	IrDA, RS-232 post, Intel 2700G 3D MMA w/16 MB VRAM, VGA Out

== See also ==
- Dell
- Pocket PC
- Microsoft Windows Mobile
