= S. "Sundi" Sundaresh =

Engineering executive

Subramanian "Sundi" Sundaresh is an engineering executive.

== Education ==
Sundaresh holds a B'Tech degree in electrical engineering from the Indian Institute of Technology, Madras, a MS degree in electrical engineering from Cornell University, and an MBA from The Wharton School at the University of Pennsylvania.

== Career ==
S. "Sundi" Sundaresh held various positions at Hyundai Electronics, Hewlett-Packard, and National Semiconductor. He spent a number of years at Adaptec over two separate periods. Initially Sundaresh served in a number of positions at Adaptec, including corporate vice-president and general manager for the Personal I/O division and corporate vice president of worldwide marketing.

Sundaresh was president and CEO of Jetstream Communications in July 1998 which pioneered voice over Internet Protocol technology. Jetstream ceased operations and assets were sold to Paradyne Networks in April 2002. He became the president and CEO of Candera Inc. (formerly Confluence Networks) in September 2002, which marketed a network storage controller. Candera went out of business by December 2004.

Sundaresh returned to Adaptec as the company's executive vice president of product development and worldwide marketing. In May 2005, he moved to the position of president of Adaptec, and in November 2005 became its CEO. He left the CEO position on 4 January 2010, but stayed on as one of Adaptec's consultants to help sell its operations.

Sundaresh was named to the board of directors of SandForce in June 2010.

He joined GridGain Systems, as its board of directors. in October 2013. S. 'Sundi' Sundaresh was also appointed as president and chief executive officer of Xangati in November 2013.
