= Intel 2700G =

Graphics co-processor

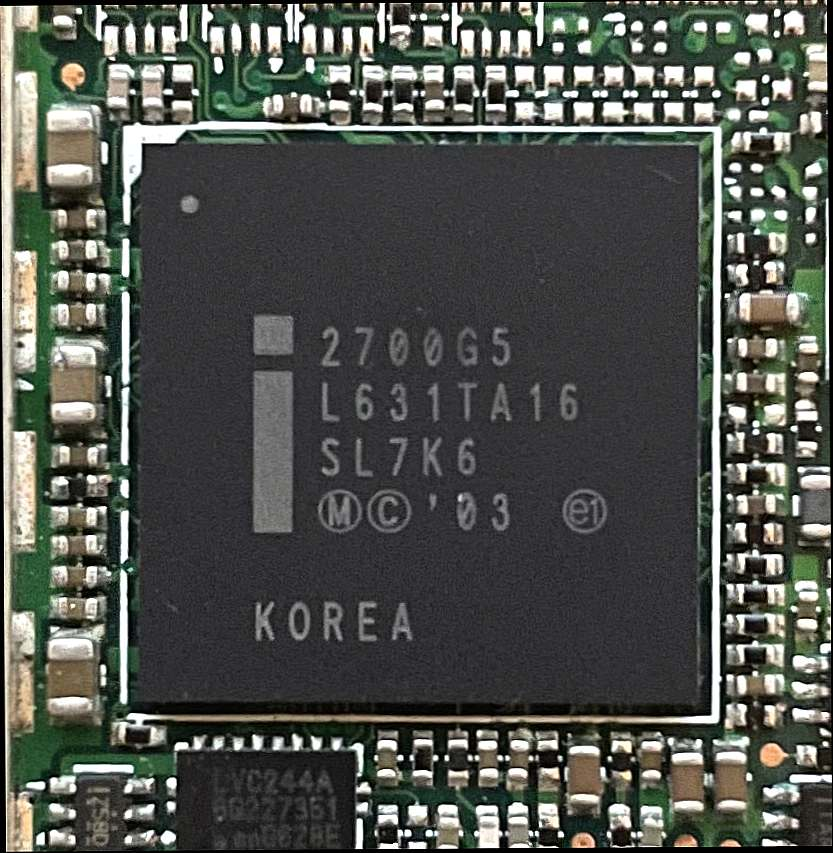
Intel 2700G5 from Dell Axim X51V

Intel 2700G (code-named Marathon) is a high-power (70 mW max) graphics co-processor for the XScale PXA27x processor, announced on April 12, 2004. It is built on both the PowerVR MBX Lite chip design (which is a descendant from the PowerVR2 graphics technology that powered the Dreamcast) and on the MVED1 video encoder/decoder technology.

== Variants ==
This accelerator comes in 3 variants: The 2700G3, 2700G5 and 2700G7.

=== 2700G3 ===
The 2700G3 is the value version of the accelerator. It has 384 kB of on-die memory suitable for driving an HVGA (320×480) or smaller graphics display.

=== 2700G5 ===
The 2700G5 is the performance version of the accelerator. It has 704 kB of on-die memory suitable for driving a VGA (640×480) resolution display and decoding MPEG-4 video.

=== 2700G7 ===
The 2700G7 is the same as the 2700G5 but is stacked with 16 MB of local memory with a 100 MHz, 32-bit bus (maximum 400 MB/s theoretical bandwidth) in the same package.

== Features ==
All the chips have a 75 MHz, 32-bit core shipped in BGA packaging.

=== Accelerated dual display ===
The 2700G has its own LCD controller and two LCD outputs. This allows for the XScale processor and 2700G's graphics displays to be used at the same time. The 2700G can drive an external display up to 1024×768 (with 32-bit colour) or 1280×1024 (with 16-bit colour).

=== 2D graphics acceleration ===
The accelerator supports clipping, alpha blending and anti-aliasing. It also has a variety of block level transfer (BLT) functions. The 2D accelerator is capable of up to an 84 million pixels per second fill rate (150 million pixels per second claimed by intel).

==== 2D features of Intel 2700G ====
- ROP 2,3,4
- Alpha Blending
- Full-screen antialiasing
- BitBLT, StretchBLT, CSCBLT
- Hardware doubling and multiplication of pixels
- Color depth of 16, 18, and 24 bit

=== 3D graphics acceleration ===
The 2700G has a complete hardware rendering pipeline and is compatible with the OpenGL ES 1.0 standard, using the common-lite profile. The 3D accelerator is capable of processing about 831 000 triangles per second (944,000 triangles per second claimed by intel).

==== 3D features of Intel 2700G ====
- Screen tiling
- Texture compression
- Flat shading and Gouraud shading
- Perspective correct texturing
- Vertex fogging
- Pixel Alpha Blending
- Bilinear, trilinear, and anisotropic filtering
- Dot3 bump mapping.
- Full-screen AA (supersampling)
- Z-buffer
- Internal ARGB rendering
- Hardware converter of integer values into floating point

=== Video acceleration ===
The 2700G performs Inverse Zig-Zag, Inverse Discrete Cosine Transform, and Motion Compensation to speed up MPEG-1, MPEG-2, MPEG-4 and WMV video decoding. The accelerator can decode MPEG-1, MPEG-2 and WMV at 720×576 (DVD Resolution), MPEG-4 at 640×480, and H.264/AVC baseline at 352x288, all at 30 frames per second.

== Devices ==
The 2700G was featured in the Dell Axim X50v, Dell Axim X51v, Gigabyte GSmart t600, Pepper Pad 2 and Palm Foleo (cancelled). It was also used in some standalone signage kiosks such as the MediaStaff DS and HID's, such as the Clipsal DALIcontrol DCLCD70 LCD Touch Screen Controller, and the Advantech UbiQ-350 and UbiQ-470.

As of Intel selling its XScale unit to Marvell, the graphics processor is discontinued.

== See also ==
- XScale processor
- Imageon - ATI
- Adreno - Developed by Qualcomm
- GoForce - Competing mobile graphics processors
- PowerVR
- ARM Mali
