= ADATA =

Taiwanese manufacturer of storage devices

ADATA Technology Co., Ltd.
- Native name: 威剛科技股份有限公司
- Type: Public
- Traded as: TPEx: 3260
- Industry: Computer storage Computer memory
- Founded: 4 May 2001; 25 years ago
- Founder: Li-Pai (Simon) Chen
- Headquarters: New Taipei City, Taiwan
- Key people: Simon Chen (Chairman); Shalley Chen (President)
- Products: Memory cards USB flash drives External hard drives DRAMs; Solid state drives Industrial technology LED lighting Powerbanks
- Brands: XPG
- Revenue: ▲TWD$ 25.597 billion (2019)
- Operating income: ▲TWD$ 2.826 billion (2019)
- Net income: ▲TWD$ 441.769 million (2019)
- Total assets: ▲TWD$ 24.465 billion (2019)
- Total equity: ▼TWD$ 8.007 billion (2019)
- Number of employees: 1,400 (2019)
- Website: www.adata.com www.xpg.com

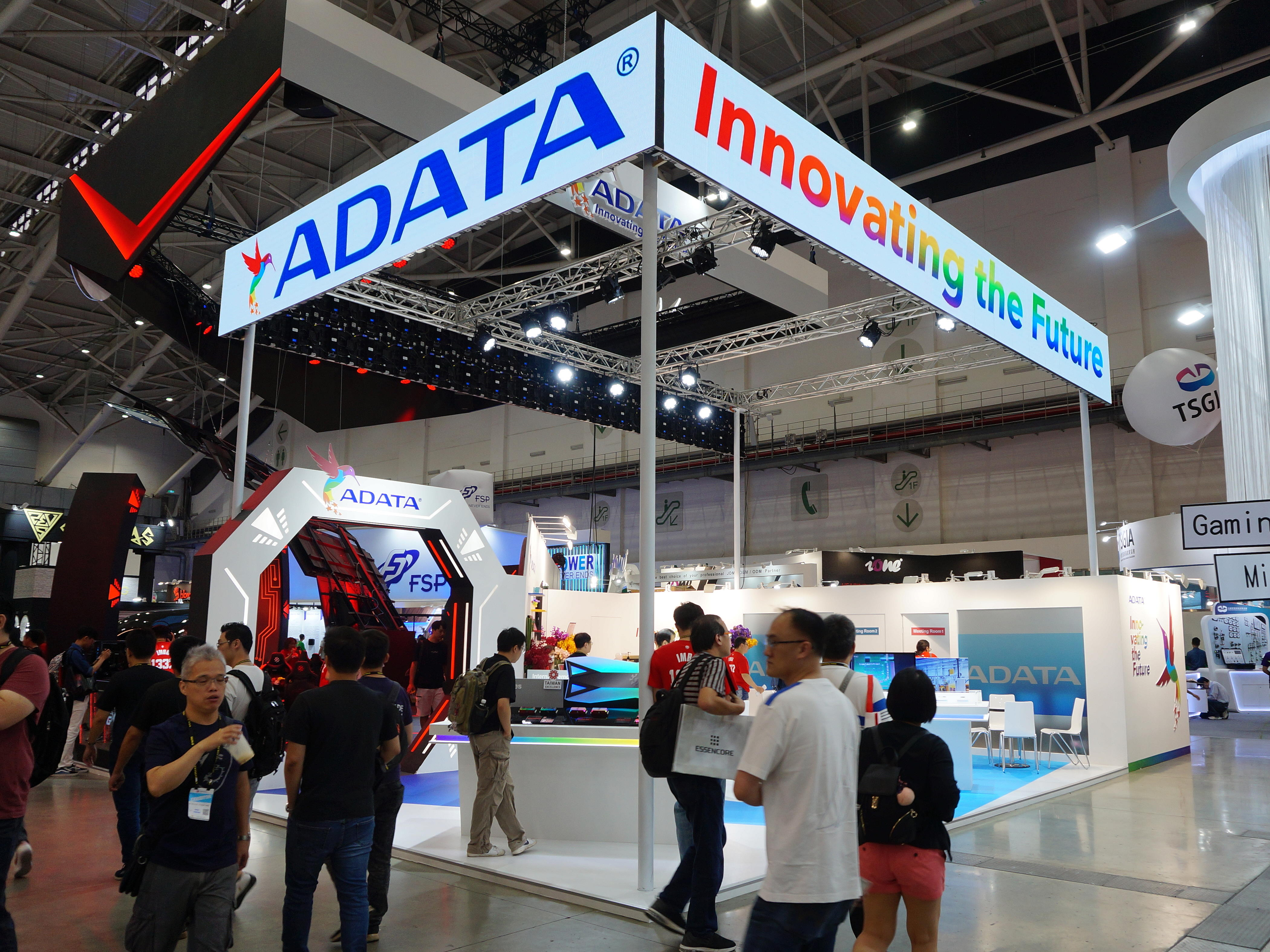
Booth at the Computex in 2019

ADATA Technology Co., Ltd. (Chinese: 威剛科技股份有限公司; pinyin: Wēigāng Kējì Gǔfènyǒuxiàngōngsī) is a Taiwanese fabless hardware manufacturer, founded in May 2001 by Simon Chen (Chinese: 陳立白). Its main product line consists of DRAM modules, USB flash drives, hard disk drives, solid state drives, memory cards and mobile accessories. ADATA is also expanding into new areas, including robotics and electric powertrain systems. In addition to its main ADATA brand, the company also sells PC gaming hardware and accessories under its XPG ("Xtreme Performance Gear") brand since 2008.

In 2017, ADATA was the second-largest DRAM module manufacturer in the world by revenue and had a market capitalization of US$680 million.

== Product lines ==
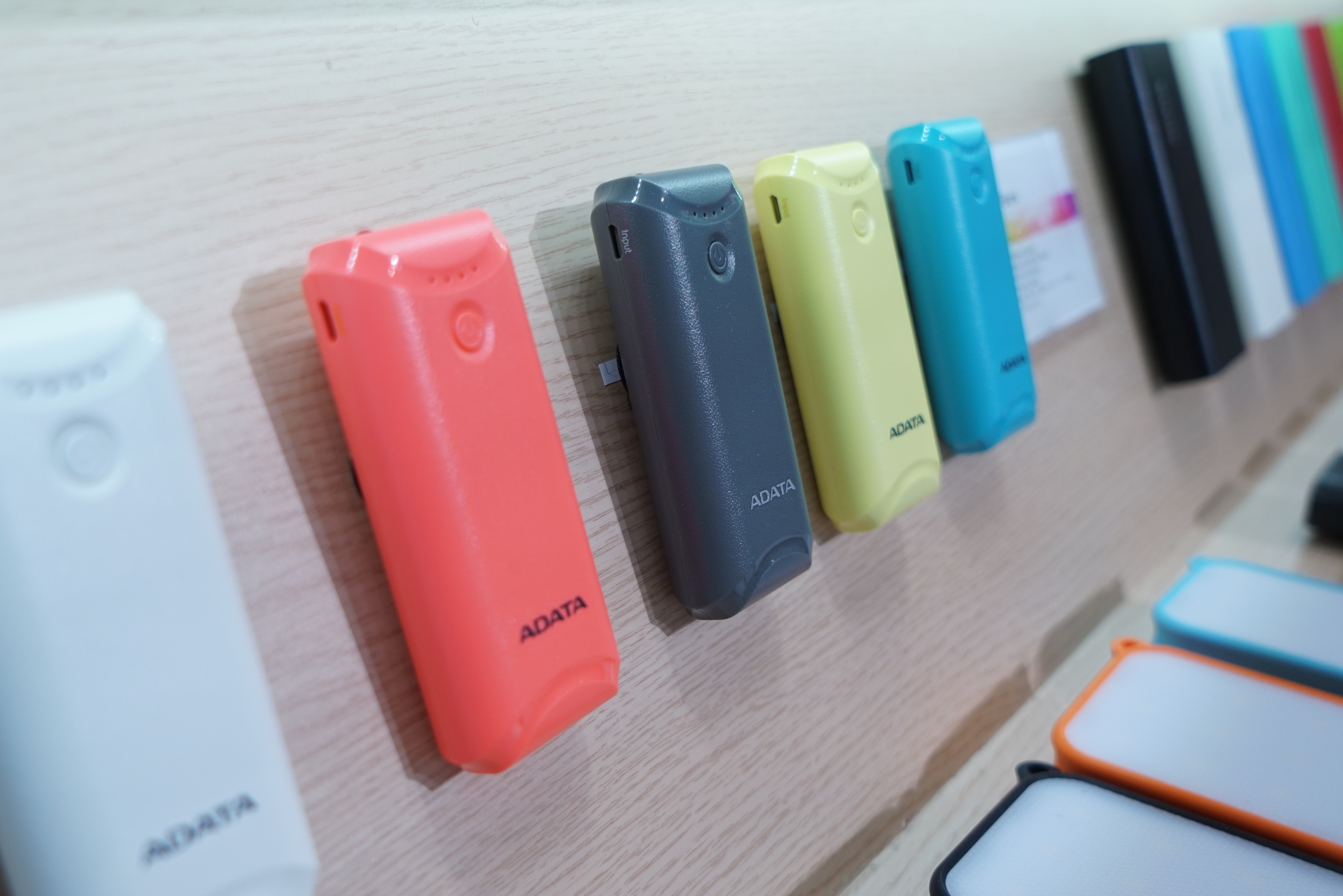
ADATA's latest power banks on display at the Computex in 2018

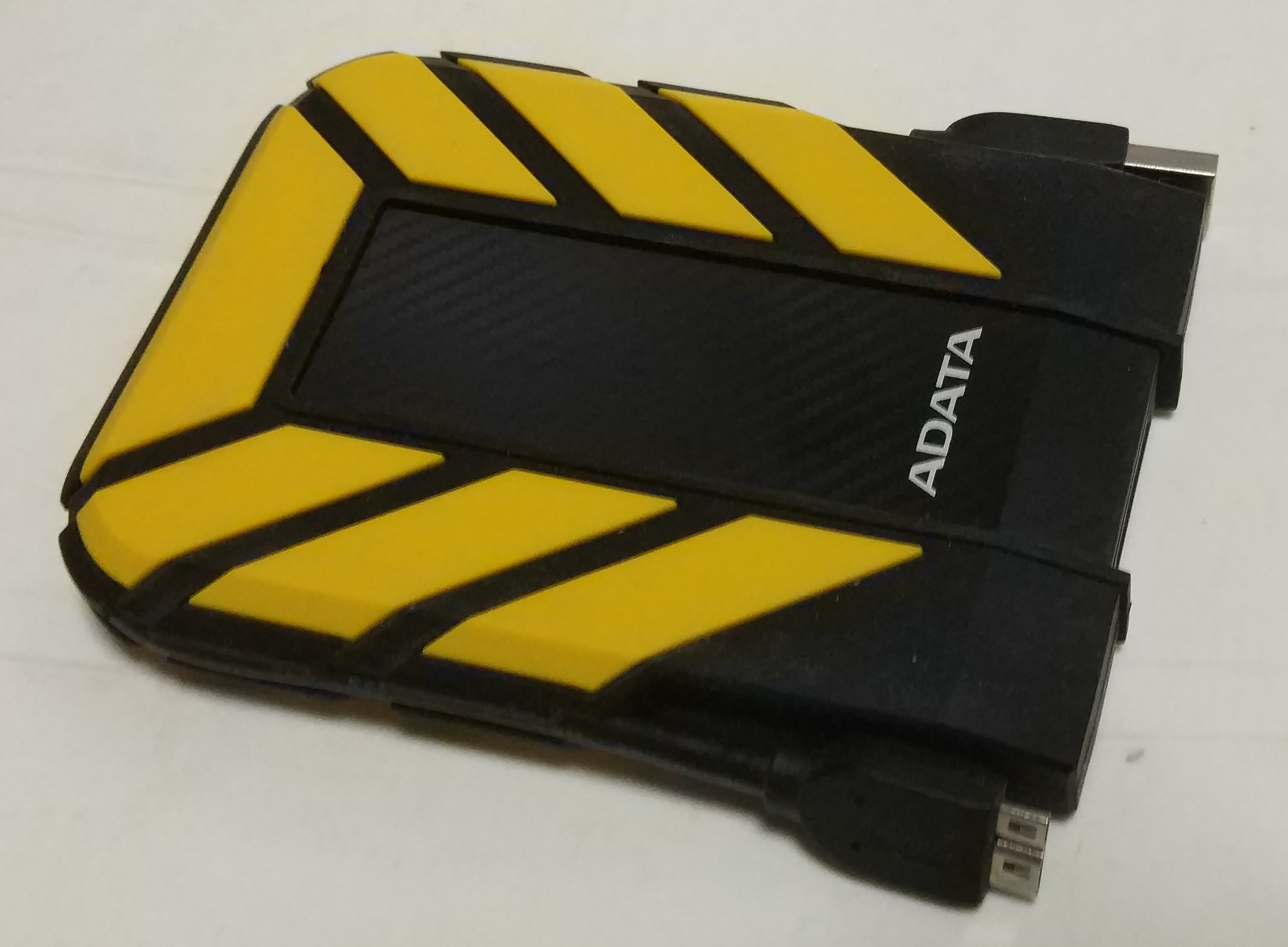
ADATA external USB 3.0 hard disk drive

Consumer

- DRAM modules for desktop and notebook PCs
- Solid-state drives
- External storage (HDDs, SSDs, enclosures)
- USB flash drives
- Memory cards / readers
- Power banks
- Car / wireless / USB chargers
- USB / microUSB / Lightning cables
- Media adapters

XPG (gaming)

- Computer memory
- SSDs
- Power supply units
- PC chassis
- Cooling
- PC accessories
- Monitors
- Laptops
- Gaming peripherals (keyboards, mice, mousepads, headsets)
- Lifestyle gears (MANA gaming chewing gum)

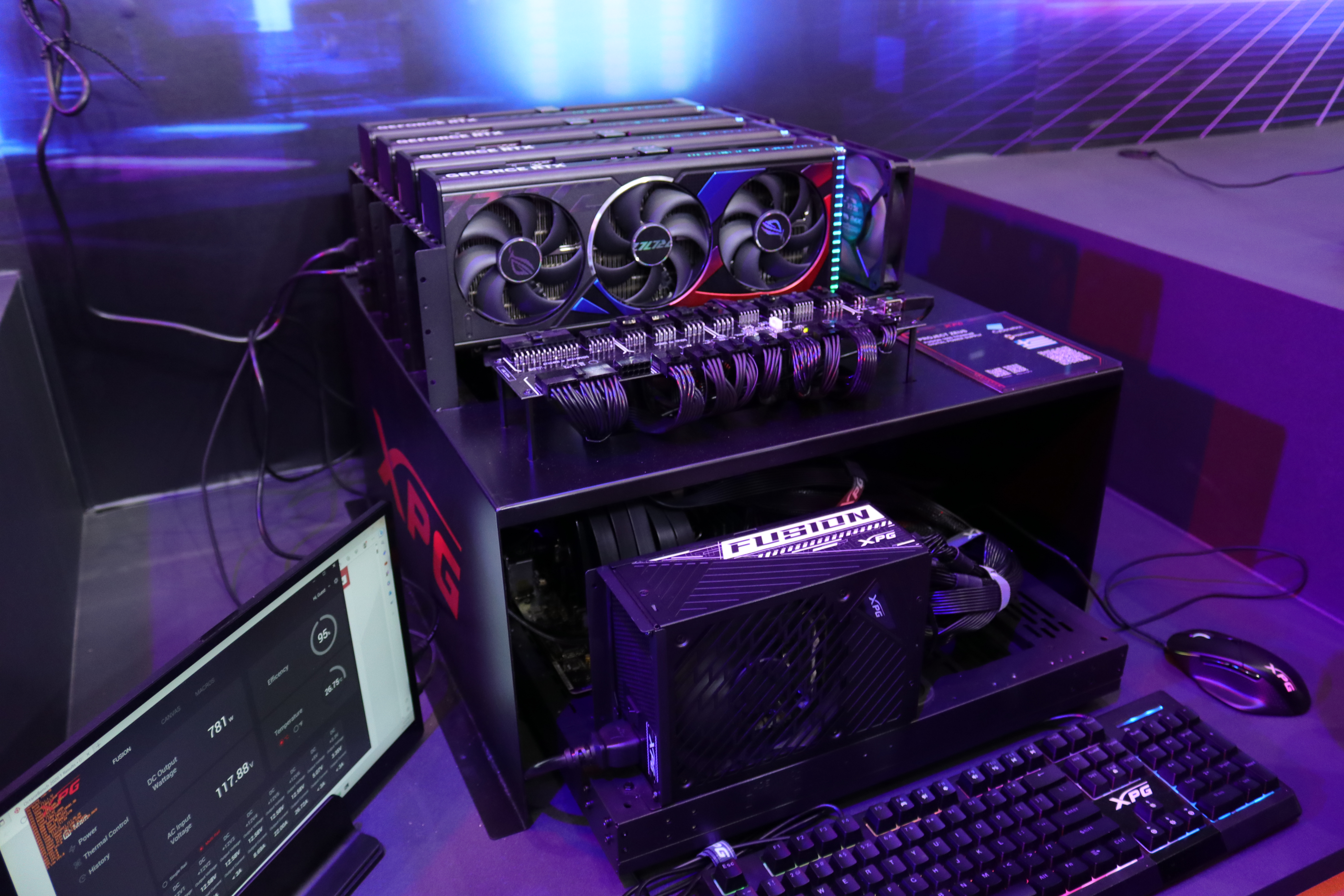
XPG FUSION 1600W 80 Plus Titanium-certified PSU powering four Nvidia GeForce RTX 4090 GPUs at the Computex in 2023

Industrial

- Solid-state drives / flash storage
- Card / UFD / embedded
- DRAM modules

Lighting

- Home lighting
- Industrial / commercial lighting
- Smart lighting
- Lighting for outdoor activities

Powertrain

- Two-wheels
- Tri-wheels
- Industrial

== History ==
- In October 2004, ADATA shares began trading on the Taipei Exchange under stock code 3260.
- In 2008, ADATA established the high-performance gaming brand XPG.
- In 2010, ADATA Technology founded ADATA Lighting, officially entering the LED lighting business.
- On October 19, 2012, ADATA Technology held a board meeting, during which Zhou Shouxun was appointed Vice Chairman of ADATA, a nomination led by ADATA's Chairman Chen Libai through Boda Investment.
- On December 19, 2012, the Sports Administration of the Executive Yuan announced that ADATA Technology won the bid for the second issuance of sports lottery tickets, with the issuance period from January 1, 2014, to December 31, 2023.
- On August 7, 2013, China Times Electronic News reported that ADATA Lighting officially entered the LED business, focusing on LED bulbs for home living and small commercial offices as the main product. ADATA's Chairman Chen Libai was optimistic about the LED lighting industry, entering a "golden decade" from 2013, with the traditional lighting market gradually being replaced by LED lighting.
- On June 15, 2017, Zhou Shouxun resigned as Vice Chairman of ADATA Technology.
- In July 2017, ADATA Technology's consolidated revenue for June reached NT$2.754 billion, marking a near 41-month high, with a total consolidated revenue of NT$15.837 billion for the first half of the year.
- In 2019, ADATA Technology's annual pre-tax net profit was NT$650,875 thousand, and the after-tax net profit was NT$441,769 thousand, with earnings per share of NT$2.04, ranking second among the top ten global SSD module brands.

== See also ==
- List of companies of Taiwan

== Sources ==
- "Technology Fast 500 Asia Pacific 2004 Winners Report" (PDF). Archived from the original (PDF) on 2013-06-15.
- "Top Taiwan Global Brands 2007 Winners announced". Archived from the original on 2014-04-19.
