= Injunctions in English law =

Legal remedies

Injunctions in English law are a legal remedy of three types. Prohibitory injunctions prevent an individual or group from beginning or continuing actions which threaten or breach the legal rights of another. Mandatory injunctions are rarer and compel a person to carry out a certain act such as make restitution to an injured party. Freezing injunctions relate to funds such as bank accounts and are commonly Mareva Injunctions which are sought mainly in fraud, breach of trust and confiscatory proceedings. Injunctions are most common in cases involving significant matters of nuisance, privacy and libel (reputational damage); they are relatively common remedies in major employment/agency/distribution, trust and property disputes, especially interim, interlocutory injunctions pending settlement or final hearing, whichever is the earlier where there is a clear and present danger that the matter in dispute between the parties will be wholly frustrated (such as irretrievably removed outside of the jurisdiction) if the injunction is not imposed. A final hearing only may impose a final injunction which may be equivalent to undertakings given in a legally binding settlement document.

== Prohibitory injunctions ==
A prohibitory injunction prevents an individual or group from beginning or continuing an action which threatens or breaches the legal rights of another.

Most common types of cause of action include:

- To protect confidential information obtained in a commercial relationship.
- To restrain a breach of contract or enforce a restrictive covenant.
- To prevent a party pursuing legal proceedings, that is, an anti-suit injunction.

Damages must not be an "adequate" alternative, which word has been interpreted broadly in regards to particular classes of assets such as precious works of art, removal of obstructions to rights of way and restraint of trespass but narrowly in regards to many commercial contexts. An injunction should only be sought where no other form of remedy (for example, damages or rescission) would provide an adequate solution to the claims.

The substantive claim should be investigated and formulated as fully as possible before an interim injunction is sought.

If the application is made without notice, the applicant and his solicitors owe particular duties to the court including that they must make a fair presentation to the court of the material facts and the law relevant to the application (the general duty of full and frank disclosure applies). Even if the application for an injunction is made on notice, the court will expect a high standard of conduct and disclosure.

Undertaking in damages. An applicant will usually be required to give certain undertakings to the court, including an undertaking in damages. A solicitor must ensure that the client fully appreciates the cost implications and consequences of the undertaking in damages before seeking an injunction.

The applicant must ensure any proposed injunction could be effectively enforced. If it could not be, it will not be granted.

== Types of injunction ==
There are a number of different types of injunction available:

- Freezing injunctions
- Search injunction
- Springboard injunctions
- Orders directing a party to provide information about the location of property or assets
- Orders requiring delivery up of property under section 4 of the Torts (Interference with Goods) Act 1977

== Injunctions against Ministers of the Crown ==
The case of M v Home Office in 1993 established that an injunction could be issued against a minister of the crown acting in an official capacity.

== Family law ==
See:

- Non-molestation order
- Occupation order

== Privacy ==
- Anonymised injunctions in English law
- Super-injunctions in English law
- Hyper-injunctions in English law
- Contra mundum injunction

== Other ==
- Quia timet injunctions (to mandate or restrain an action when faced with an imminent threat)
- Pyjama injunctions is the nickname given to interim injunctions decided late at night
