= Domestic violence in the United Kingdom =

Domestic violence and abuse in the United Kingdom are a range of abusive behaviours that occur within relationships. Domestic violence or abuse can be physical, psychological, sexual, financial or emotional. In UK laws and legislation, the term "domestic abuse" is commonly used to encompass various forms of domestic violence. Some specific forms of domestic violence and abuse are criminal offences. Victims or those at risk of domestic abuse can also be provided with remedies and protection via civil law.

This is consistent with the Istanbul Convention, whose member countries must provide protection orders to victims of domestic abuse to ratify this treaty.

== Statutory definition ==
The Domestic Abuse Act 2021 creates a statutory definition of domestic abuse, but there are no offences related to this definition. Rather pre-existing offences make certain forms of domestic abuse illegal.

This definition states that behaviour is abusive if it involves "physical or sexual abuse; violent or threatening behaviour; controlling or coercive behaviour; economic abuse; or, psychological, emotional or other abuse." In order for such behaviour to be classed as domestic abuse, it must occur between two people who are over the age of 16 and "personally connected" to each other.

Relationships which constitute as "personally connected" are if the two parties are, or have been:

1. married or civil partners to each other;
2. engaged;
3. in an intimate person relationship with each other;
4. in a parental relationship with the same child;
5. relatives.

== Helplines ==
There are helplines available for women experiencing domestic abuse such as The National Domestic Abuse Helpline. The National Domestic Abuse Helpline (telephone number 0808-2000-247) from Refuge gives support, help and information about domestic violence. This helpline is confidential, free and available 24 hours per day.

The ManKind Initiative provides a hotline for men experiencing domestic abuse. The hotline Galop provides services for those LGBT relationships who experience abuse.

== Domestic abuse shelters ==
There are charities that provide temporary accommodation sometimes with associated therapeutic services for those escaping domestic abuse.

It was reported in December 2017 that women fleeing domestic violence may be subject to a postcode lottery over whether refuge accommodation is available for them or not. The Guardian reported in 2018 that "thousands" of women fleeing domestic violence were put into unsuitable housing, such as housing where a toilet leaks and housing overrun with mice, creating a risk that some women will return to the abuser. The newspaper reported that 12% of vulnerable women fleeing domestic abuse were forced to sleep rough before contacting a shelter. Male victims of domestic violence also face challenges when seeking refuge as there are only 19 shelters in the UK offering refuge to men – 78 places in total (of which just 20 places are available for the exclusive use of men).

== Civil remedies ==
The Domestic Abuse Act 2021 has created a single domestic abuse protection order to unify, though not necessarily replace, the current civil law protection orders such as non-molestation orders. Although this Act has passed, currently the new domestic abuse protection orders that have been created have not come into force.

== Criminalization ==
There are no laws specifically against domestic abuse, but a number of other laws make certain specific forms of domestic abuse illegal such as those involving homicide, assault, harassment, or sexual abuse.

== Legal aid ==
Legal aid is provided for parents who want a court to prevent another parent seeing their child or obtain a divorce through the Family Courts if they have experienced certain forms of domestic abuse. A number of pre-existing crimes are considered domestic abuse.

Criminal Offences within England relating to domestic abuse for legal aid
Statutory Legislation	Domestic abuse act
Offences against the Person Act 1861, s.16	Threats to kill
Offences against the Person Act 1861, s.18+20	Wounding and causing grievous bodily harm
Offences against the Person Act 1861, s.23+24	Administering poison
Offences against the Person Act 1861, s.47	Common assault
Theft Act 1968, s.21	Blackmail
Criminal Damage Act 1971, s.1	Destroying or damaging property
Criminal Damage Act 1971, s.2	Threats to destroy or damage property
Child Abduction Act 1984, s.1+2	Abduction of a child by parent or other persons
Criminal Justice Act 1988, s.39	Common assault and battery
Protection from Harassment Act 1997, s.2	Harassment
Protection from Harassment Act 1997, s.2A+4A	Stalking
Sexual Offences Act 2003, s.1	Rape
Sexual Offences Act 2003, s.2	Assault by penetration
Sexual Offences Act 2003, s.3	Sexual assault
Sexual Offences Act 2003, s.62+63	Committing an offence with intent to commit a sexual offence
Serious Crime Act 2015, s.76	Controlling or coercive behaviour in an intimate or family relationship
Anti-social Behaviour Crime and Policing Act 2014, s.121	Offence of forced marriage
Modern Slavery Act 2015, ss.1, 2+4	Slavery or compulsory labour, or human trafficking
Domestic Violence, Crime & Victims Act 2004, s.1	Breach of non-molestation order
Female Genital Mutilation Act 2003, s.5A	Breach of a Female Genital Mutilation protection order
Family Law Act 1996, s.42A	Breaching non-molestation order
Family Law Act 1996, s.63A	Breach of forced marriage protection order
Public Order Act 1986, s.4	Fear or provocation of violence
Public Order Act 1986, s.4A + 5	Harassment, alarm or distress

Civil orders in England relating to domestic abuse
Statutory legislation	Description
Family Law Act 1996, s.42	Non-Molestation Order
Family Law Act 1996, s.33, 35-38	Occupation Order
Domestic Violence, Crime and Victims Act 2004, s.12	Restraining Order
Crime and Security Act 2010, s.24-33	Domestic Violence Protection Orders and Notices

== Perpetrators ==
Some men have repeatedly killed female partners. In the case of Theodore Johnson, convicted of murder in January 2018 and eventually jailed for a minimum of 30 years, he was found guilty of manslaughter on two previous occasions because of his mental health.

== History ==
The history of domestic abuse examines the shift from domestic abuse being socially acceptable to unacceptable and how the law has evolved with that social evolution.

In 1510, Anthony Fitzherbert, a judge, published a manual for legal procedure called The New Natura Brevium. This manual described the writ of supplicavit which was available to wives whose husbands threatened to beat or kill them and allowed the court to punish a husband in these situations. However, the writ had an exception for threats required for the lawful "sake of Government and Chastisement" of a wife. The extent of this exception is unclear. This right to beat was challenged but affirmed in Thomas Seymore Case with Edward Coke issuing a dissenting opinion denying any right of a husband to beat his wife.

The Lord Leigh case of 1674, ruled that wife beating had not been intended as permissible in the New Natura Brevium but only allowed for admonition and confinement to the house. Wife-beating was increasingly frowned upon in the 17th century which Doggett argued in part stemmed from the Protestant conception of Marriage. Puritans conceptualised marriage as analogous to the relationship between Christ and the Church, viewing the husband as dominant but imposing standards. The clergy and moralists advised husbands against wife-beating. However, many legal writers ignored the Leigh ruling stating that wife beating was a husband's right.

In 1782, the rule of thumb was satirised as an 'ancient doctrine' when Judge Francis Buller was reported as trying to review the principle, with Buller being depicted as 'Judge Thumb'.

During the Victorian period, some voices were heard to highlight and criticise violence against women. These included influential contributions from novelists and from reviewers such as John William Kaye and Frances Power Cobbe.

The issue of domestic abuse achieved national prominence in 1971, following marches as part of the Reclaim the Night movement, the world's first refuge for domestic violence victims opened. The refuge was established by Erin Pizzey at Belmont Terrace in Chiswick, London. It has since been rebranded as the charity Refuge (United Kingdom charity). Pizzey's pioneering work was widely praised. In 1973 Jack Ashley stated in the House of Commons that "The work of Mrs. Pizzey was pioneering work of the first order. It was she who first identified the problem, who first recognised the seriousness of the situation and who first did something practical by establishing the Chiswick aid centre. As a result of that magnificent pioneering work, the whole nation has now come to appreciate the significance of the problem". Ashley was the first to use the term 'domestic violence' in its modern sense – meaning violence in the home. The term previously referred primarily to civil unrest, violence from within a country as opposed to violence perpetrated by a foreign power. (Note: Compare the July 18, 1877 request for help sent to President Rutherford B. Hayes by West Virginia governor Henry M. Mathews following the outbreak of strikes and riots: "Owing to unlawful combinations and domestic violence now existing at Martinsburg and other points along the line of the Baltimore & Ohio Railroad, it is impossible with any force at my command to execute the laws of the State.") The public pressure that surmounted from these protests for women's rights caused the UK to produce its first piece of legislation tackling domestic violence: the Domestic Violence and Matrimonial Proceedings Act 1976 which created civil protection orders for victims.

== Statistics ==
In 2024, across the UK and Ireland, the rate of reported domestic violence was;

- England/Wales, 1 in 70
- Scotland, 1 in 86
- Northern Ireland, 1 in 65
- Republic of Ireland, 1 in 78

Northern Ireland has some of the highest rates of femicide and domestic violence within Europe, a fact that has caused gender-based violence in Northern Ireland to be called an "epidemic".

=== England and Wales ===
Estimated domestic abuse cases in England and Wales
Year	Female	Male
2022	1.7M (6.9%)	699k (3.0%)
2021		
2020	1.6M (7.3%)	757k (3.6%)
2019	1.6M (7.5%)	786k (3.8%)
2018	1.3M	695k
2017	1.2M	713k

- Between one in three and one in four women will likely report to having been affected by domestic abuse during their lifetime.
- Between one in six and one in seven men will report to having been affected by domestic abuse during their lifetime.
- In cases of alleged domestic abuse in England and Wales, 84.3% of accusations are for non-physical abuse, 12.9% of accusations are for sexual abuse, and 20% of accusations are for stalking.
- Most persons alleging domestic abuse are women.
- Most persons accused of domestic abuse are men.
- 50% of domestic violence between heterosexual partners is reciprocal or bi-directional: meaning that both the man and the woman are violent.
- 50% of domestic violence between heterosexual partners is uni-directional: meaning one partner is violent, and that the other partner does not reciprocate. Women are the perpetrators in 70% of cases of uni-directional domestic violence. These numbers are not accounted for by claims of 'self-defence'. Women retaliate with violence more often than men, but they also initiate violence more often than men.
- According to the Office for National Statistics (ONS) about 3.0% of men and 6.9% of women suffered domestic abuse in England and Wales during 2022. This equates to about 699,000 male and 1,700,000 female victims.
- Previous statistics have shown that on average two women are murdered every week and 30 men are murdered every year due to domestic violence. 16% of violent crime is domestic abuse, though domestic abuse is least likely to be reported to the police. There are more repeat victims of domestic abuse than repeat victims of any other crime. On average domestic abuse victims will have been assaulted 68 times before reporting it to the police. Domestic abuse is the single most quoted reason a person becomes homeless. Nearly 87% of homeless people are men. The lack of domestic abuse shelters for men may be a factor in this.
- Age UK provided figures in 2019 showing 200,000 people aged 60 to 74 experienced domestic abuse in England and Wales during one year, but unrecorded abuse could mean the actual figures are higher. People over 74 were not included in the figures. Caroline Abrahams of Age UK said, "There’s a widespread misconception that domestic abuse only happens to younger people but sadly hundreds of thousands of older people are affected, too."
- In 2017 it was reported that the Office for National Statistics's research findings suggested that over 10% of 16-19-year-old women are affected by the issue each year.
- Until March 2020, the Crime Survey for England and Wales showed that an estimated 2.3 million adults aged 16 to 74 years experienced domestic abuse in the last year (1.6 million women and 757,000 men). For statistics on the referrals of suspects of domestic abuse-flagged cases from the police to the Crown Prosecution Service (CPS) for a charging decision fell 19% to 79,965, from 98,470 in the year ending March 2019. Over three-quarters of domestic abuse-related, CPS prosecutions were successful in securing a conviction (78%), a similar level to 2019.
- The 2023 Crime Survey for England and Wales reported that 22% of men and 16% of women received physical injuries in the past year which includes "minor bruising or blak eye, scratches, severe bruising or bleeding from cuts, internal injuries or broken bones/teeth".
- There were 522 victims of homicide recorded in year ending (YE) March 2025, 8% lower than the previous year (566 victims) and the lowest number recorded since YE March 2015 (504).
- The homicide rate was 8.6 homicides recorded per million population during YE March 2025, the lowest rate since 1977.
- The number of male victims (366) decreased by 10% (from 408), while the number of female victims (155) remained similar to the previous year (158).
- There were 111 domestic homicides in YE March 2025, slightly lower than the previous year (117) and of these victims, 75 were women and 36 were men; 67 were killed by a partner or ex-partner.

=== Effects of COVID-19 ===
During the coronavirus pandemic in 2020, there was generally an increase in demand for domestic abuse victim support services, including a 65% increase in calls and contacts logged by the National Domestic Abuse Helpline between April and June 2020, compared with the first three months of the year. According to the Crime Survey for England and Wales (CSEW) year ending March 2020, an estimated 5.5% of adults aged 16 to 74 years (2.3 million people) experienced domestic abuse in 2019. The police also recorded a total of 1,288,018 domestic abuse-related incidents and crimes in England and Wales (excluding Greater Manchester Police) (Note: Data for Greater Manchester Police (GMP) on domestic abuse-related incidents and crimes are not included in this publication because of issues with their data supply following the implementation of new IT systems. Any total police recorded crime data refer to England and Wales excluding GMP.) in the year ending March 2020. Of these cases, 41% (529,077) were incidents not subsequently recorded as a crime. The remaining 59% (758,941) were recorded as domestic abuse-related crimes.

Increases in demand for domestic abuse support were particularly noticeable following the easing of lockdown measures in mid-May 2020, such as a 12% increase in the number of domestic abuse cases handled by Victim Support in the week lockdown restrictions were eased. However, as the offences rate flagged as domestic abuse-related has been gradually increasing in recent years, and therefore it is not possible to determine if the coronavirus (COVID-19) pandemic have attributed to the increases in 2020. Labour MP Jess Phillips said the government focused too much on criminal justice, while police resources were cut and the availability of refuge beds was reduced.

== Family court ==
Changes to legal aid meant, in the first 9 months of 2017, 3,234 people claiming to have been abused had to self-represent and appear in court with the people they claimed had abused them. This contrasted with 1,309 such people in the first 9 months of 2012.

Applicants' assets are taken into account when deciding if they qualify for Legal Aid. Some applicants are unable to fully access their assets because those assets are controlled by their former partner. This can hamper attempts to secure legal representation in court. Mark Groves of the National Centre for Domestic Violence said, "While many people think Legal Aid is free, it is not. You have to pay a means-tested contribution. Economic abuse victims who don't control their money may not have this [and] those who have fled the family home may not have the right documentation. If you own a house, you have to put down a cash deposit equal to the equity in that house, which could be hundreds of thousands."

Sometimes people accused of domestic violence are able to intimidate their former partner into not appearing in court, resulting in cases being dropped. A report by Police and Northumbria Crime Commissioner, Dame Vera Baird QC, monitored over 220 cases. It suggested that cases where the complainant failed to appear can too easily be dismissed, and that criminal justice services need more resources.

== Marginalised groups ==
Immigrants are especially vulnerable to domestic violence. Since 2012 under the hostile environment policy immigrants who are victims of domestic abuse are increasingly deported. The Guardian wrote, "The refusal rate for applications under the domestic violence rule rose from 12% in 2012 to 30% in 2016, the last year for which full-year data was available. The figures show that 1,325 people were refused out of a total of 5,820 applications made between 2012 and 2016." Abuse victims may be deported based on what the abuser states without their case being heard.

In Scotland there is an initiative to reduce domestic violence called the Equally Safe Strategy. This involves early intervention in domestic abuse cases affecting women, girls and children. The Caledonian Programme dealing with men convicted of crimes involving domestic abuse will be expanded to help reduce re-offending and the Rape Crisis Sexual Violence Prevention Programme will also be introduced in more schools. A rape and sexual abuse support service in England and Wales is also receiving a boost.

Most refuges do not have disabled access though disabled women are more likely to experience domestic abuse than able bodied women. One in ten refuge places is accessible to domestic violence victims with physical disabilities. Out of 131 councils 20 had no accessible places at all. 16.8% of women with chronic sickness or disability suffer domestic abuse compared to 6.3% of able bodied women. Domestic abuse can involve physical, sexual or emotional abuse, as well as not providing care from people with long lasting sickness or disability. Data collected from 144 out of 210 UK councils contacted shows that Council funding for women's refuges overall fell by 6% over the five years to 2018. The largest reduction in spending on domestic violence refuges was from Southampton City Council, which cut spending by 65% since 2013/4.

Women charities in the UK have complained of domestic violence victims being subjected to racism, by being refused places for refuge on the basis of the language they speak. Victims were said to be refused for not speaking English. The charities reported that out of the 20 victims, 5 were rejected by refuges for not speaking the English language.
