= Domestic Abuse Act 2021 =

Act of the Parliament of the United Kingdom covering domestic violence

Domestic Abuse Act 2021 (Note: Section 91.)
- Act of Parliament
- Parliament of the United Kingdom
- Long title: An Act to make provision in relation to domestic abuse; to make provision for and in connection with the establishment of a Domestic Abuse Commissioner; to make provision for the granting of measures to assist individuals in certain circumstances to give evidence or otherwise participate in civil proceedings; to prohibit cross-examination in person in family or civil proceedings in certain circumstances; to make further provision about orders under section 91(14) of the Children Act 1989; to provide for an offence of threatening to disclose private sexual photographs and films with intent to cause distress; to provide for an offence of strangulation or suffocation; to make provision about circumstances in which consent to the infliction of harm is not a defence in proceedings for certain violent offences; to make provision about certain violent or sexual offences, and offences involving other abusive behaviour, committed outside the United Kingdom; and for connected purposes.
- Citation: 2021 c. 17
- Introduced by: Priti Patel, Home Secretary (3 March 2020) (Commons); Baroness Williams of Trafford, Minister of State for Home Affairs (7 July 2020) (Lords)
- Territorial extent: England and Wales; Scotland (in part); Northern Ireland (in part); (Note: Section 89.)

Dates
- Royal assent: 29 April 2021
- Commencement: Various (Note: Section 90.)
Other legislation
Amends	House of Commons Disqualification Act 1975; Matrimonial and Family Proceedings Act 1984; Police and Criminal Evidence Act 1984; Housing Act 1985; Children Act 1989; Courts and Legal Services Act 1990; Criminal Justice and Public Order Act 1994; Criminal Procedure (Scotland) Act 1995; Housing Act 1996; Protection from Harassment (Northern Ireland) Order 1997; Crime and Disorder Act 1998; Youth Justice and Criminal Evidence Act 1999; Freedom of Information Act 2000; Courts Act 2003; Sexual Offences Act 2003; Domestic Violence, Crime and Victims Act 2004; Children Act 2004; Government of Wales Act 2006; Offender Management Act 2007; Criminal Justice and Immigration Act 2008; Sexual Offences (Northern Ireland) Order 2008; Sexual Offences (Scotland) Act 2009; Crime and Security Act 2010; Criminal Justice and Licensing (Scotland) Act 2010; Serious Crime Act 2015; Modern Slavery Act 2015; Sentencing Act 2020
Amended by	Domestic Abuse Support (Relevant Accommodation and Housing Benefit and Universal Credit Sanctuary Schemes) (Amendment) Regulations 2021; Health and Care Act 2022; Police, Crime, Sentencing and Courts Act 2022; Criminal Justice Act 2003 (Commencement No. 33) and Sentencing Act 2020 (Commencement No. 2) Regulations 2022; Online Safety Act 2023; Judicial Review and Courts Act 2022 (Magistrates’ Court Sentencing Powers) Regulations 2023; Victims and Prisoners Act 2024; Domestic Abuse Act 2021 (Amendment) Regulations 2024

Status: Amended

Text of statute as originally enacted

Revised text of statute as amended

The Domestic Abuse Act 2021 (c. 17) is an act of Parliament of the United Kingdom. The act included provisions necessary to ratify the Istanbul Convention. Much of the content within the act is still much debated. The act is intended to help tackle domestic violence in the United Kingdom, which has been referred to as a "silent epidemic". There have been numerous suggestions to address the act's protection of victims of domestic violence.

== The Act ==
=== Definitions ===
The Act created the first statutory definition of domestic abuse to ensure that "domestic abuse is properly understood, considered unacceptable and actively challenged across statutory agencies and in public attitudes". The Act has created a genderless, broad definition which has not greatly expanded on the pre-existing cross-governmental definition.

The definition is described in Section 1, which states that the behaviour must be "abusive" and the parties involved must be "personally connected" to each other. Section 1(3) describes abusive behaviour as: "physical or sexual abuse; violent or threatening behaviour; controlling or coercive behaviour; economic abuse; psychological, emotional or other abuse; and it does not matter whether the behaviour consists of a single incident or a course of conduct." Section 2 describes relationships which are "personally connected" to each other, which includes relationships where the parties have been or are married, engaged, civil partners, in a relationship, or are related.

This definition has come under criticism from charities preventing violence against women, predominantly due to the genderless approach that it has taken. Women are not recognized by the Act as being disproportionately affected by domestic abuse in Britain. Statistics across various sectors and identity groups demonstrate that women are experience higher rates of domestic abuse than men due to historical and "patriarchal dynamics surrounding the use of violence". The Government justified this decision as ensuring "that all victims and all types of domestic abuse are sufficiently captured".

=== Children ===
The Act defines children who witness domestic abuse as victims of abuse. This recognizes the detrimental effects of children experiencing domestic abuse within the home and how they are classed as the "invisible victims". Section 3 states that anyone under 18 years of age who "sees or hears, or experiences the effects of the abuse" and is related to either or both of the parties is a child who is "a victim of domestic abuse".

=== Domestic Abuse Protection Orders ===
The Domestic Abuse Act 2021 created a new Domestic Abuse Protection Order ('DAPO') and Notice ('DAPN') which aims to unify the current protection orders within the UK. This is following aims to offer "maximum protection to all victims" of domestic violence in the UK in order to prevent the violence from recurring in the home.

The United Kingdom currently recognizes four protection orders for victims of domestic abuse: Occupation Orders, Non-molestation Orders, Restraining Orders and Domestic Violence Protection Orders. There is confusion surrounding when these orders apply and what conditions they can impose, with DAPOs and DAPNs seek to address. The new DAPO and DAPN aims to replace the old Domestic Violence Protection Notices and Domestic Violence Protection Orders.

DAPO and DAPN are currently at a pilot stage in order to "assess the effectiveness and impact of the new model prior to national roll out".

The Crime and Policing Act 2026 amends the rules concerning DAPOs.

=== Domestic Abuse Commissioner ===
The Act creates a new branch of Government called the Domestic Abuse Commissioner. Their role is to laid out in Part 2, which states that their general function includes "good practice in - the prevention of domestic abuse; the prevention, detection, investigation and prosecution of offences involving domestic abuse; the identification of people who carry out domestic abuse, victims of domestic abuse and children affected by domestic abuse; and the provision of protection and support to people affected by domestic abuse". The Commissioner is an independent branch to provide the Government with "independent and objective advice which can be relief upon by statutory agencies and the voluntary sector alike".

=== Operation Encompass ===
Section 49A (inserted by the Victims and Prisoners Act 2024) makes it a legal requirement for police forces to share Operation Encompass Notifications with schools and other educational establishments, i.e. notifications intended to fulfil the objective that

if a member of the [police] force has reasonable grounds to believe that a child who resides in the police area may be a victim of domestic abuse, any relevant educational establishment is notified as soon as is reasonably practicable except in such circumstances as may be specified in regulations made by the Secretary of State.

=== Cross-examination and domestic abuse ===
The act includes provisions to prevent cross-examination by those who have been found guilty of certain offences against another, or an injunction for certain actions which the other party has been given the opportunity to challenge for certain actions has been granted, of where there is other evidence for domestic abuse. This applies to criminal proceedings,civil proceedings, and family court.

== Criticisms ==
In addition to criticisms of how gender is treated in defining domestic abuse, the UK government also received criticism for taking eight years to implement its commitments following the Istanbul Convention.

== See also ==
- Domestic Abuse Commissioner
