= Springboard (disambiguation) =

A springboard is used for diving and is a board that is itself a spring, i.e. a linear flex-spring, of the cantilever type.

Springboard may also refer to:

- SpringBoard, the standard application that manages the iPhone's home screen
- Springboard, codename of Service Pack 2 updates for the Windows XP operating system
- Springboard, an aerial technique in professional wrestling when a wrestler using any of the ring ropes bounces upward
- SpringBoard, a pre-Advanced Placement program created by the American not-for-profit organization College Board
- Springboard (gymnastics), a platform set upon one or usually multiple springs used in artistic gymnastics
- Springboard Expansion Slot, a versatile expansion slot devised for Handspring's range of Palm OS PDAs
- Springboard injunction, a form of court order preventing misuse of confidential information
- Springboard Press, an imprint of Grand Central Publishing
