= Treo 90 =

Early "smartphone" without call function

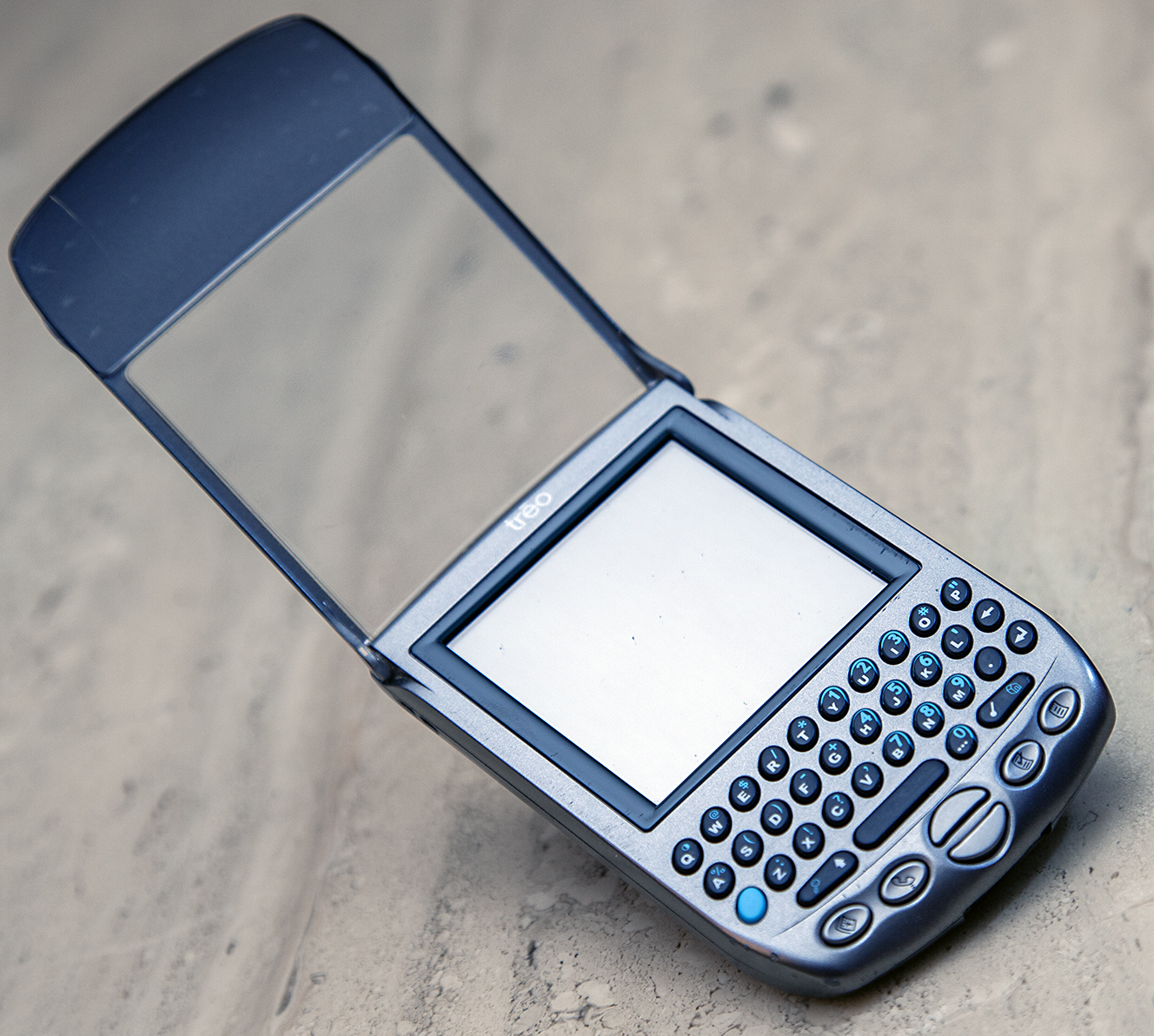
- Handspring Treo 90
- Manufacturer: Handspring
- Type: PDA
- Media: 16 MB internal RAM
- Operating system: Palm OS 4.1H (upgradeable to Palm OS 4.1H3 on Flash ROM )
- CPU: 33 MHz Motorola MC68VZ328
- Display: 160x160 pixels, 4096 colors (12-bit depth) CSTN
- Input: Touchscreen miniature QWERTY keyboard
- Connectivity: Infrared, USB (SDIO support when Palm OS upgraded to version 4.1H3)
- Power: Proprietary non-removable 550 mA·h rechargeable Li-ion battery
- Dimensions: 4.25 x 2.8 x 0.4 in.
- Successor: Treo 180

The Treo 90 is a Palm OS PDA developed by Handspring. It was released on May 28, 2002. The Treo 90 was the only Treo model produced without an integrated cellular phone. When first released it was the smallest Palm OS device on the market.

== Design ==
The Treo 90 features a 12-bit standard (160x160) resolution color super-twisted nematic display, LED backlighting, a miniature QWERTY keyboard that replaces the usual Graffiti on other PDAs, an infrared port and an SD card slot.

== ROM update ==
The original Palm OS (4.1H) lacks SDIO support and reportedly has trouble formatting 128 megabyte SanDisk cards. The Treo 90 Updater addresses this problem and adds some other edits. The update is not a software patch but is burned into ROM.

The ROM 4.1H3 update allows the use of SD Cards up to 1 GB (confirmed).

Additionally the new SDIO capability allows users to expand the device's features with two expansion cards: the Palm Bluetooth card, which allows the Treo 90 to access the Internet, email and messages wirelessly with a Bluetooth-enabled mobile phone and MARGI Systems Presenter-and-Go which connects the Treo 90 directly to digital LCD projectors or other VGA devices to show business presentations stored on the Treo in full color.

== See also ==
- List of Palm OS Devices
- Palm Treo
- Palm OS
