= Treo 180g =

- Manufacturer: Handspring
- Type: Smartphone
- Media: 16 MB internal RAM
- Operating system: Palm OS 3.5.2H
- CPU: 33 MHz Dragonball
- Display: 160x160 pixels, monochrome 16 shades
- Input: Touchscreen; Graffiti
- Touchpad: Entire screen
- Connectivity: Infrared, USB (SDIO)
- Power: Proprietary non-removable rechargeable Li-ion battery
- Dimensions: 4.25 x 2.8 x 0.83 in.
- Predecessor: Treo 180
- Successor: Treo 270

The Treo 180g is a dual-band GSM smartphone made by Handspring.

== Overview ==
Released in 2002, it was the third device in the Treo family. The 180g is essentially the same as its predecessor, the Treo 180, except that it uses Palm's proprietary Graffiti handwriting recognition software.

It features a Graffiti area in place of the Treo 180's miniature QWERTY keyboard and shipped with Palm OS version 3.5.2H. The 180g has a 160x160 monochrome screen, 16 MB of internal memory and a 33 MHz Dragonball CPU. Two main models were produced, the 180 with a thumb-type keyboard and the 180g which uses the Graffiti handwriting recognition software, both were flip form factor. At its release it cost 400 dollars.
