= Treo 600 =

2003 Palm OS–based smartphone by Handspring (later palmOne and Palm)

Palm Treo 600

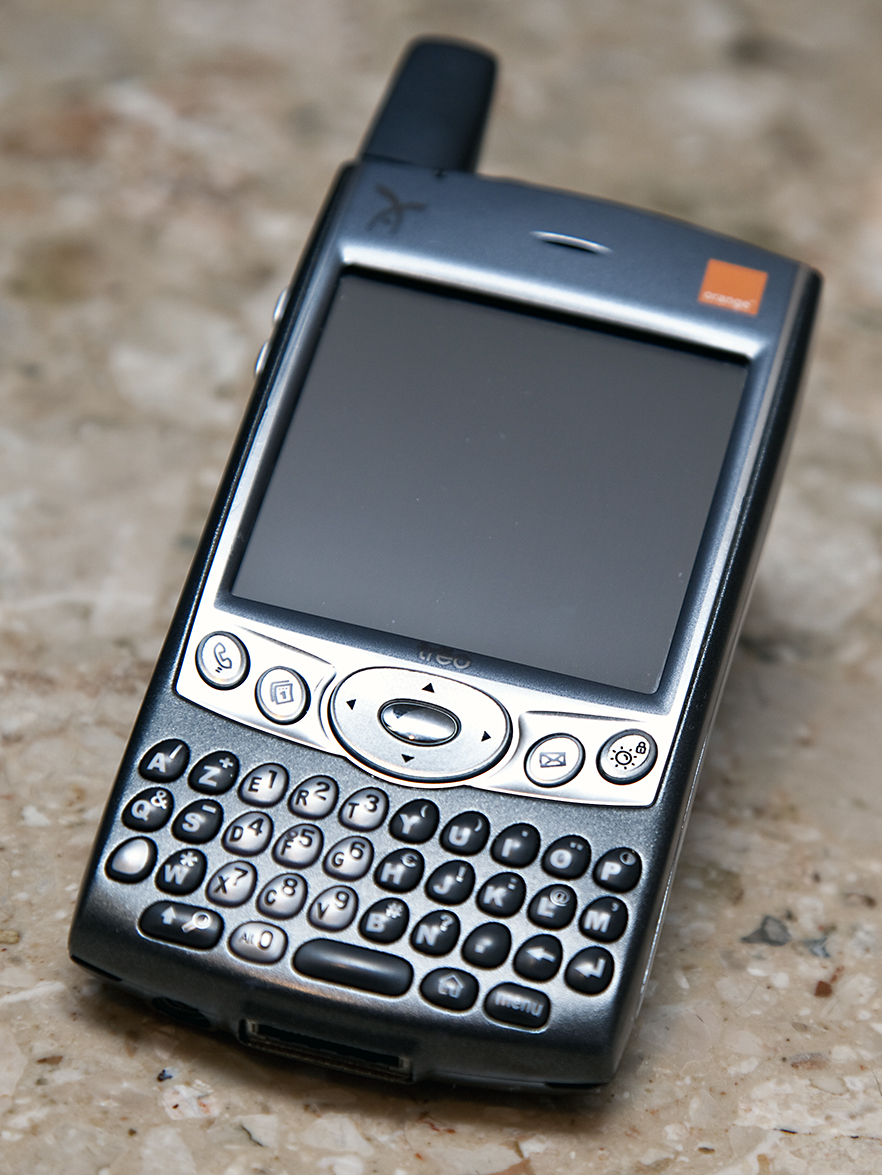
- Manufacturers: Palm, (as the "palmOne"); Handspring (before merger)
- Type: Smartphone
- First released: November 2003
- Predecessor: Treo 270/300
- Successor: Treo 650
- Dimensions: 4.4 in × 2.4 in × 0.9 in (11.2 cm × 6.1 cm × 2.3 cm)
- Weight: 5.9 oz (170 g)
- Operating system: Palm OS 5.2.1H
- CPU: Texas Instruments OMAP1510 (144 MHz, ARM925T, 130 nm)
- Memory: 32 MB, 24 MB available user storage
- Removable storage: MMC, SD, not compatible with SDHC
- Battery: 1800 mAh rechargeable lithium-ion battery
- Rear camera: 0.3-megapixel
- Display: 160x160 2.5in., 3,375-colors passive LCD, touchscreen
- Connectivity: USB, IrDA (SIR mode only)
- Data inputs: Keypad

Treo 600 was a smartphone developed by Handspring, and offered under the palmOne brand (later Palm, Inc.) after the merger of the two companies. Released in November 2003, it has a number of integrated features and it is possible to check the calendar while talking on the phone, dial directly from contacts list, take pictures or send emails. It includes a five-way navigation button and favorites screen allowing quick access to the phone functions.

On October 24, 2004, palmOne officially unveiled the Treo 600's successor, the Treo 650.

== Design ==
The Treo 600 is a rather large device by cell phone standards, but compact for a PDA. The 600 is slightly wider and deeper than its predecessor and is nearly half an inch slimmer, giving it a more cell-phone like feel. The new form factor has been compared to a bar of soap. The design is definitely an example of form-follows-function, the front of the phone consists of a full QWERTY keyboard at the bottom with menu and home buttons at the bottom right. Above the keyboard are the 4 application buttons with a "five-way" navigator in-between. Each application button can be mapped to two applications, with the exception of the last button which has one of its functions permanently mapped to the on/off. Above the buttons and navigator is a small Treo logo and the large 160x160 color touch screen.

The top of the phone is occupied by the earpiece, antenna, SDIO/MMC slot; in front of the slot is the infrared port with the power button which can be used to turn off the screen, or, if held down for a few seconds can turn off the radio functions. Opposite of the IR port is a switch which, by default is set to switch between normal ringer operation and silent mode with vibration. The back of the Treo is simple enough with a Palm logo at the bottom with a reset pin hole offset to the right.

On the back of the phone towards the top is a sticker with various serial numbers and a triangular-shaped speaker grill offset to the left. Above the speaker grill is the VGA camera lens and the top of the stylus is visible above and to the left of the lens. The bottom of the Treo houses the 2.5 mm jack, which can output stereo sound and accept an adapter for standard 3.5 mm jack. Next to the audio jack, in the center of the phone, resides a connector used for data transfer and charging. The upper left side of the phone contains two volume keys; the right side is a mirror image of the left without the volume keys.

== Specifications ==
- Mobile phone, GSM/GPRS model with 850/900/1800/1900 MHz bands, CDMA model with 800/1900 MHz bands.
- 144 MHz ARM processor.
- 32 MB RAM (24 MB available storage).
- Built-in rechargeable lithium-ion batteries, lasting more than 24 hours in normal usage.
- Palm OS ver 5.2.1H complete with standard applications including web browsing, email, calendar, and contacts.
- Size 4.4 in × 2.4 in × 0.9 in (11.2 cm × 6.1 cm × 2.3 cm)
- Weight 5.9 oz (170 g)
- Display 160×160 pixels CSTN backlit display
- SDIO / SD / MMC memory slot.
- MP3 and stereo audio headset compatible (requires a converter to accept standard headset).
- Digital camera VGA (640×480) resolution (Most models)
- Infrared com port and touch-screen with stylus.
- Backlit keyboard with phone dial layout.
- Speakerphone and vibrate mode.
