= Treo 270 =

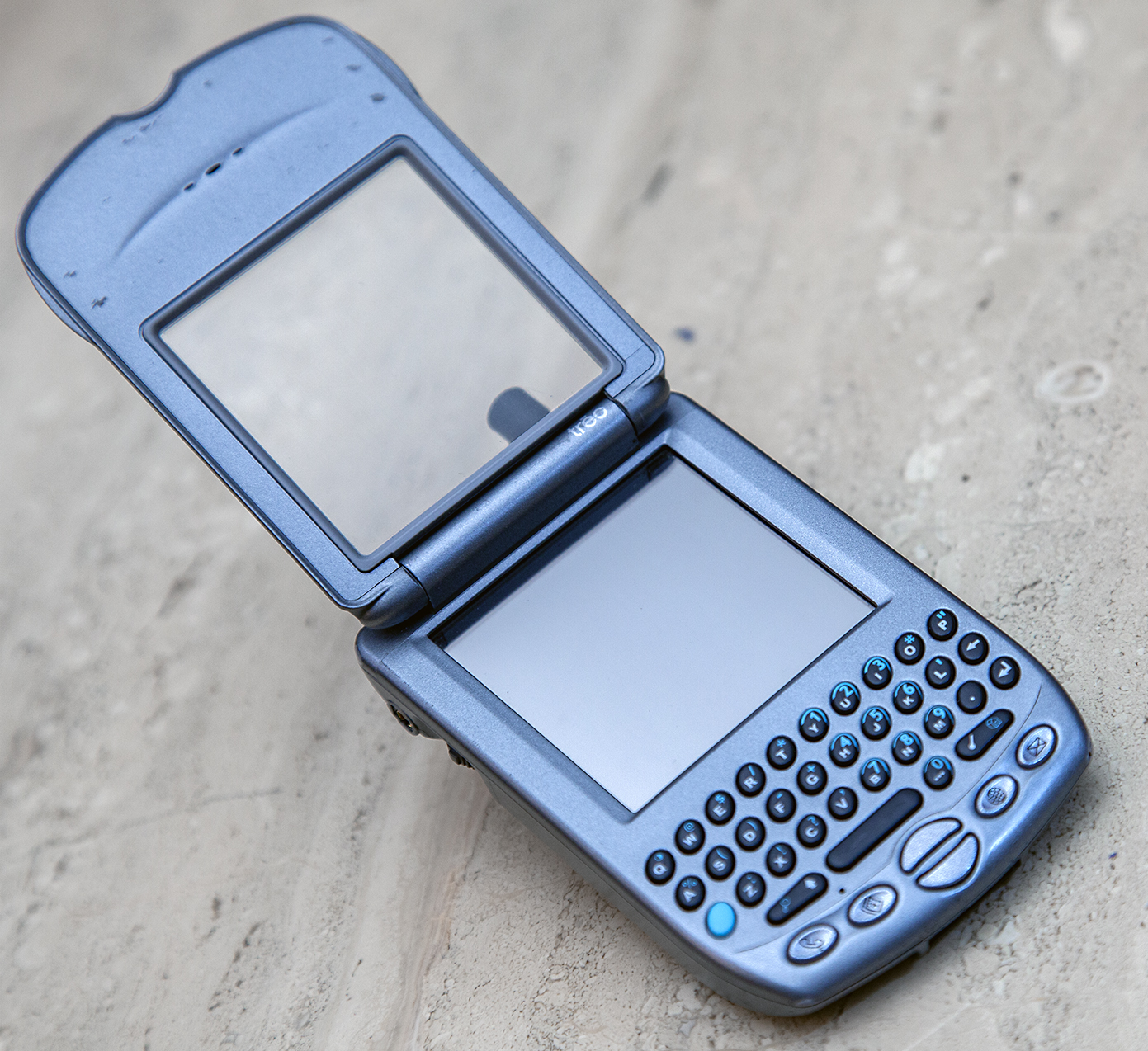
- Manufacturer: Handspring
- Type: Smartphone
- Media: 16 MB internal RAM
- Operating system: Palm OS 3.5.2H
- CPU: 33 MHz Motorola DragonBall VZ
- Display: 160×160 pixels, 4096 colors (12-bit depth) CSTN
- Input: Touchscreen; Backlit QWERTY keyboard
- Touchpad: Entire screen
- Connectivity: Infrared, USB
- Power: Proprietary non-removable 3.7 v 850 mAH rechargeable Li-ion battery
- Dimensions: 4.25 × 2.8 × 0.83 inches
- Predecessor: Treo 180g
- Successor: Treo 600

The Treo 270 is a dual-band GSM flip form factor smartphone made by Handspring. Released on May 31, 2002 for $499 with service contract, $699 without service contract, it was the fourth device in the Treo family. It features a full keyboard and shipped with Palm OS version 3.5.2H. The 270 has a 160×160 color screen, 16 MB of internal memory and a 33 MHz DragonBall CPU.

During its development, the Treo 270 was codenamed "Atlanta".

The Treo 300 is a twin model marketed by Sprint identical to the 270 except for using cdmaOne instead of GSM and being provider-locked.
