= Domestic Abuse Commissioner =

UK official

Domestic Abuse Commissioner for England and Wales
- Incumbent; Dame Nicole Jacobs since September 2019
- Appointer: Secretary of State for the Home Department
- Constituting instrument: Domestic Abuse Act 2021
- Inaugural holder: Dame Nicole Jacobs
- Website: https://www.domesticabusecommissioner.uk/

The office of the Domestic Abuse Commissioner for England and Wales is an independent agency of the Government of the United Kingdom sponsored by the Home Office. The office was established under the Domestic Abuse Act 2021.

== Role ==
The Commissioner provides public leadership on domestic abuse issues, oversees and monitors the provision of domestic abuse services across England and Wales, and works to improve the identification, protection and support of victims and survivors of domestic abuse. The Commissioner also promotes good practice and holds government and public authorities to account for their response to domestic abuse.

The office has powers to publish reports and make recommendations to public authorities and government ministers. Relevant public authorities are required to cooperate with the Commissioner and respond to recommendations made in published reports.

== Officeholders ==
Dame Nicole Jacobs was appointed Designate Domestic Abuse Commissioner in September 2019. Following the commencement of the relevant provisions of the Domestic Abuse Act 2021, she became the first statutory holder of the office. She was reappointed by the Home Office for a third term in September 2025.
