= Pyjama injunctions =

The derisory term "Pyjama" injunctions is given to English legal injunctions that are decided late at the last minute before an action is to occur. The injunctions are used to provide a decision where expediency is required.

The interim decision of judges on the European Court of Human Rights (ECHR) regarding the legality of deportation flights by the United Kingdom to Rwanda as part of their Rwanda asylum plan have been described as 'pyjama injunctions'. The ECHR injunctions are formally called "Rule 39" and can be issued late at night if the Court believes that there is a risk to an individual of "serious and irreversible harm" and all other options have been exhausted that could block the government's actions.

The legal commentator Marcel Berlins wrote that he knew of only one High Court judge that was actually wearing their pyjamas when issuing an injunction. In the early 2000s the late night injunctions were usually sought to prevent the publication by a newspaper of a story seen as damaging to the claimant.

Berlins criticised the ignorance of judges in media law as resulting in their timidity to grant publications of such stories and that it was often down to pure chance whether the judge on duty had experience in the relevant area of law.
