= Handspring, Inc. =

1998–2003 American electronics company founded by the founders of Palm, Inc

- Industry: Personal digital assistants
- Founded: June 1998; 28 years ago
- Founder: Jeff Hawkins; Donna Dubinsky; Ed Colligan
- Defunct: 2003; 23 years ago
- Fate: Acquired by Palm Inc.
- Headquarters: Mountain View, California

Handspring, Inc., was an American electronics company founded in 1998 by the founders of Palm, Inc., after they became dissatisfied with the company's direction under the new owner 3Com. The company developed Palm OS–based Visor- and Treo-branded personal digital assistants. In 2003, the company merged with Palm, Inc.'s hardware division.

== History ==
The company was founded in June 1998 by Jeff Hawkins, Donna Dubinsky, and Ed Colligan, the original inventors of the PalmPilot and founders of Palm, Inc., after they became unhappy with the direction of the company after its acquisition by 3Com. Their Visor line of PDAs synced by USB, which was significantly faster than Palm's RS232 serial sync. The Springboard expansion slot provided GPS navigation, cameras, music players, cell phone service, and most of the functions of a "smart phone".

In June 2000, during the dot-com bubble, the company became a public company via an initial public offering. The company's shares, which were listed on NASDAQ under the ticker symbol HAND, rose 35% on the first day of trading.

In 2003, the company merged with Palm, Inc.'s hardware division.

== Products ==
=== Visor series ===
==== Visor and Visor Deluxe ====
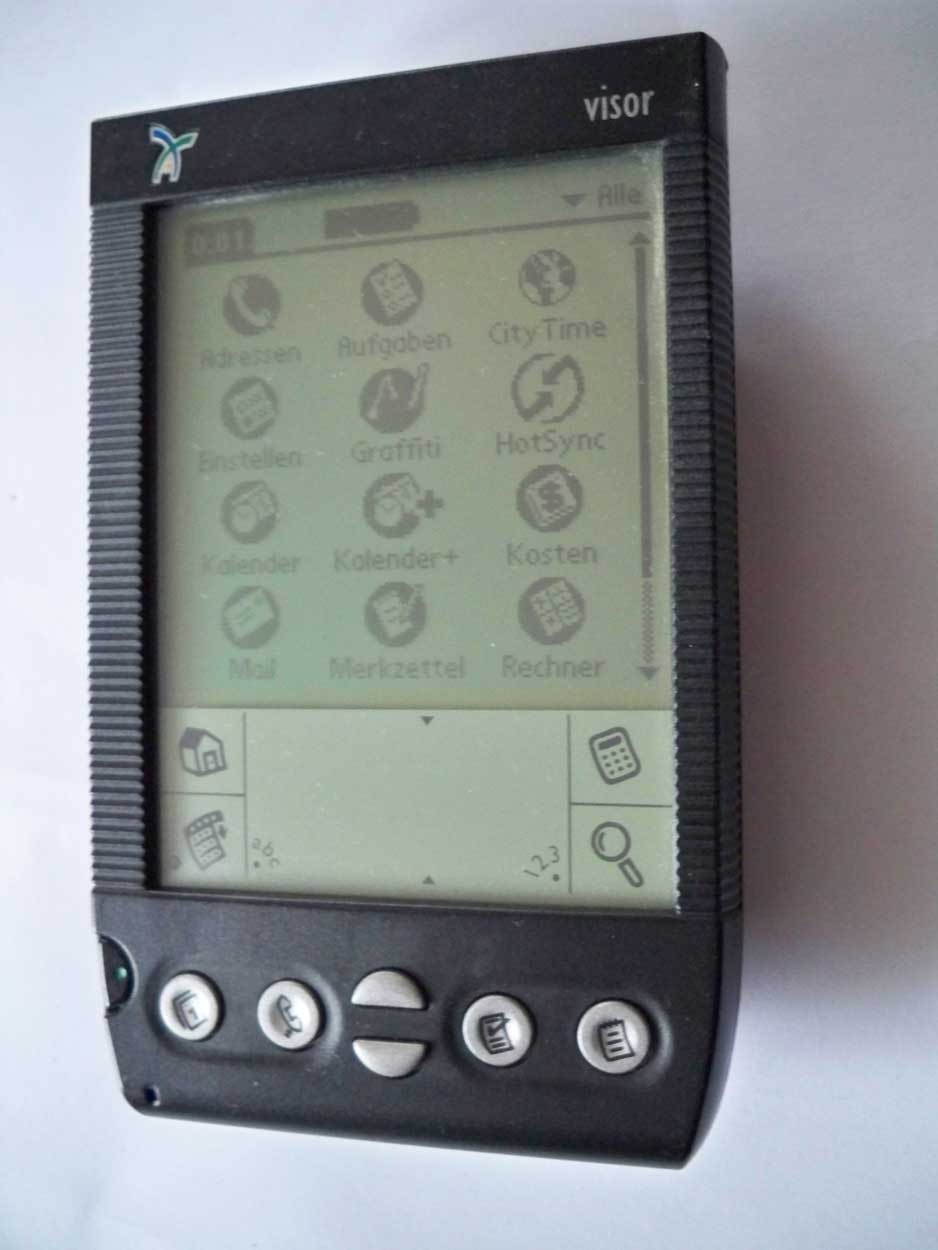
Handspring Visor Deluxe Black

Handspring first introduced the Visor Solo, which was black and contained 2 MB of onboard memory. The Visor Deluxe had the option of translucent colored models, and had 8 MB of onboard memory. The Visor and Visor Deluxe used Palm OS 3.1H running on a Freescale DragonBall processor, a modified version of the OS from Palm that included an enhanced datebook, a city time graphical world clock, and an advanced calculator. Unlike the Palm Pilot, the Visor's IrDA port was placed on the side of the device to make room for the Springboard Expansion Slot. The Visor and Visor Deluxe weight is 5.4 oz. Their dimensions are 4.8 in × 3.0 in × 0.7 in. The display is 2.25 inches square with diagonal span of 3.0 inches.

==== Visor Prism ====
When Handspring released the Visor Prism, it was flashlight-bright and the first Palm OS handheld to have a 16-bit color display (65,536 colors); the contemporary model (IIIc) produced by Palm only had an 8-bit color display (256 colors). Like Palm's IIIc, Prism's color screen turned nearly pitch black in sunlight. Prism's cobalt-blue-only case (and cradle, which required an attached AC charger, as USB cables could not supply sufficient power at the time) was a departure for a PDA line known for a broad array of colored cases. Prism's power came from a rechargeable lithium-ion battery, rather than two AAA batteries like previous Visors. However, despite the shoehorn-like contoured back to support the rechargeable battery, it did have the Visor Springboard slot; the infrared port was again on the side. The Prism featured Palm OS 3.5.2H, and weighed 6.9 oz. The dimensions were 4.8 in × 3.0 in × 0.8 in with the display measuring the same as other Visors (2.25 inches square with diagonal span of 3.0 inches). The highest OS upgrade is OS 3.5.3.

==== Visor Platinum ====
The Visor Platinum was similar to the Visor Deluxe. Apart from shell color, the exterior of the devices were indistinguishable. The Visor Platinum was available only in a silver (platinum) or black colored shell, as opposed to the Visor Deluxe's many color choices. The Platinum included a 33-MHz Motorola DragonBall VZ processor while the Deluxe only supported a 16 or 20-MHz chip. More, the Visor Deluxe used OS 3.1H while the Visor Platinum used OS 3.5.2H. At the time of the release of the Platinum, it sported the fastest processor for a Palm OS device. Like all Visors, the Platinum contained a microphone, intended to be used for Springboard slot-based cell phones.

==== Visor Edge ====
Released in March 2001, the slim Visor Edge featured an MC68VZ328 DragonBall CPU clocked at 33 MHz. The 160×160-pixel, 4-bit grayscale (16 shades of gray) display was standard for most Palm PDAs. However, at the time it was the thinnest and lightest Visor, sizing in at 4.7 in × 3.1 in × 0.44 in and weighing 4.8 ounces with the display measuring the same 2.25 inches square with diagonal span of 3.0 inches as other Visors. It was packed with 8 MB RAM and Handspring's latest version of the Palm OS, version 3.5.2H. Available in three colors, Metallic Blue, Metallic Silver, and Metallic Red, it was also eye catching. The built-in rechargeable lithium-ion battery generally lasted two to four weeks on a charge. However, due to its size, the standard Springboard slot was accessed through a slide-on sleeve rather than a built-in slot. Nevertheless, this still allowed the Visor Edge to access the Springboard Modules available.

==== Visor Neo ====
Released in September 2001, the Neo featured an MC68VZ328 DragonBall processor clocked at 33 MHz. It had 8 MB DRAM, an IrDA-compliant infrared interface, and Handspring's standard Springboard slot. Neo sported a 160×160-pixel, 4-bit grayscale (16 shades of gray) display. The 4.8 in × 3.0 in × 0.7 in unit, weighing in at 5.4 ounces, came in sleek, translucent Blue, Red, or Smoke-grey colored case. It used Handspring's modified version of the Palm OS, version 3.5.2H3. Power came from two AAA batteries that would last up to two months. This model had a lower price, with which Handspring was hoping to attract new users. The display of all Visors measured 2.25 inches square with diagonal span of 3.0 inches.

==== Visor Pro ====
Released in September 2001, the Visor Pro was Handspring's last model in its Visor series of PDAs. The 4.8 in × 3.0 in × 0.7 in unit was powered by an MC68VZ328 DragonBall processor clocked at 33 MHz. Weighing 5.7 ounces, the unit came with 16 MB RAM, a built-in microphone, and Handspring's Springboard slot. It had a 4-bit grayscale (16 grays), backlit, monochrome display. Its power supply came from a rechargeable lithium-ion battery.

==== Comparison of Visor Models ====
Name	Solo	Deluxe	Prism	Platinum	Edge	Neo	Pro
RAM Size	2 MB	8 MB					16 MB
CPU	16 MHz Motorola MC68EZ328	20 MHz Motorola MC68EZ328	33 MHz Motorola MC68VZ328				
Palm OS Version	3.1H	3.1H/3.1H2	3.5.2H			3.5.2H3	
Available Colors	Graphite (Black)	Graphite (Solid Black), Translucent Blue, Translucent Green, Translucent Orange, Ice (Clear)	Metallic Cobalt	Graphite (Black), Platinum (Silver)	Metallic Red, Metallic Blue, Metallic Silver	Translucent Red, Translucent Blue (Darker than the Deluxe), Smoke (Translucent Gray)	Silver
Display	3.0" 4-bit grayscale		3.0" 16-bit color	3.0" 4-bit grayscale			
Battery type	2xAAA		Rechargeable Li-Ion	2xAAA	Rechargeable Li-Ion	2xAAA	Rechargeable Li-Ion
Release date	September 1999		October 2000		March 2001	September 2001	

==== Gallery ====
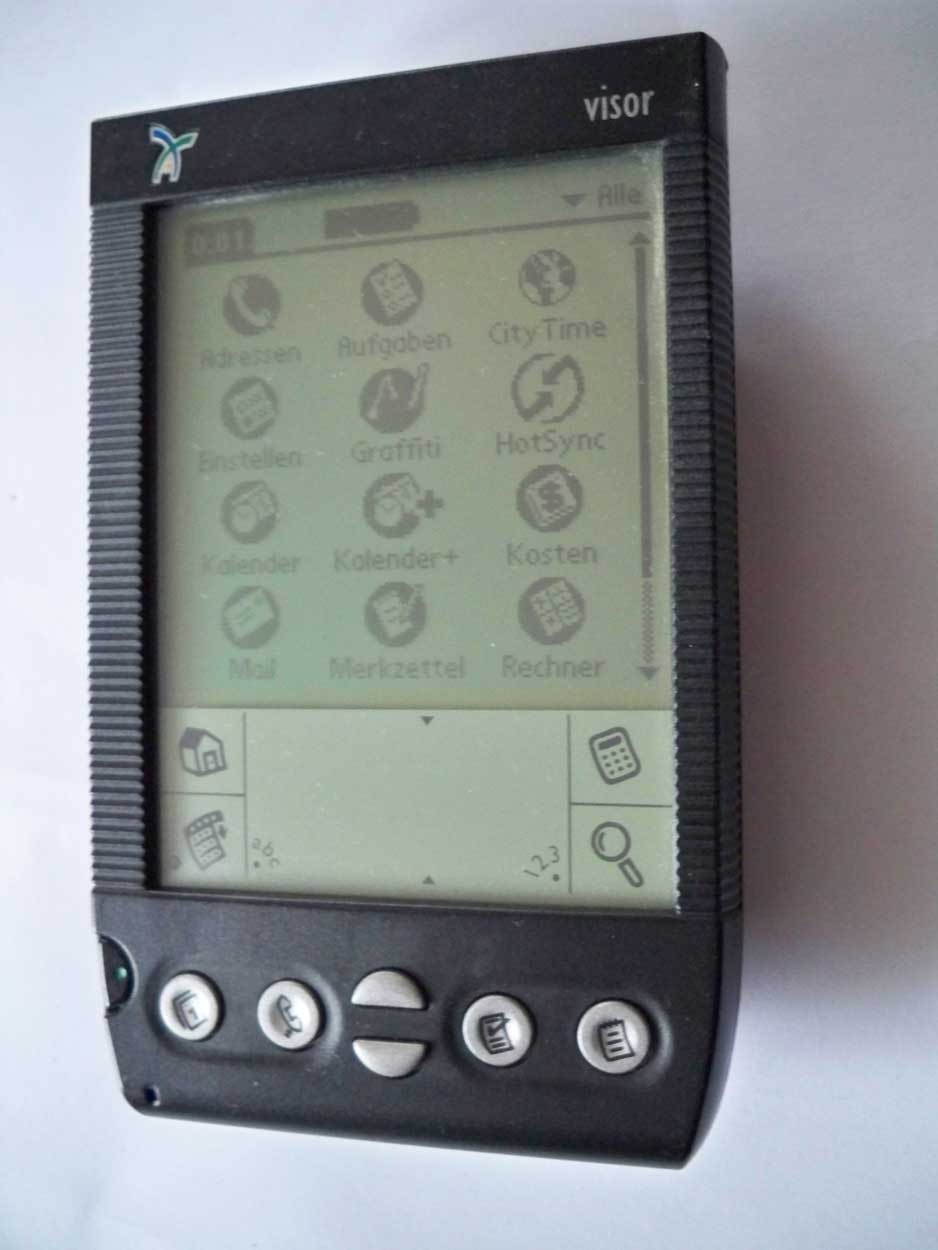
Handspring Visor Deluxe Black

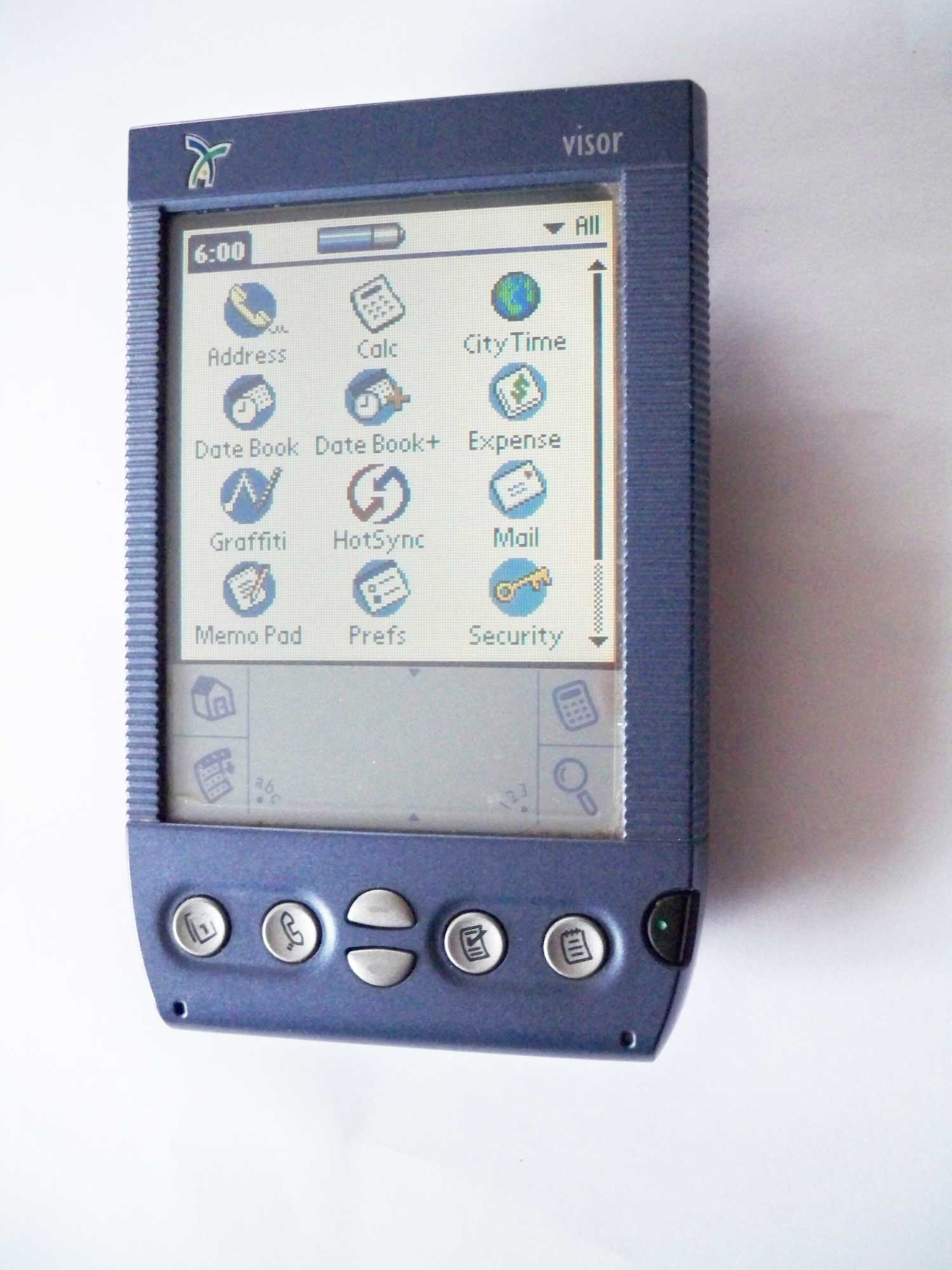
Handspring Visor Prism

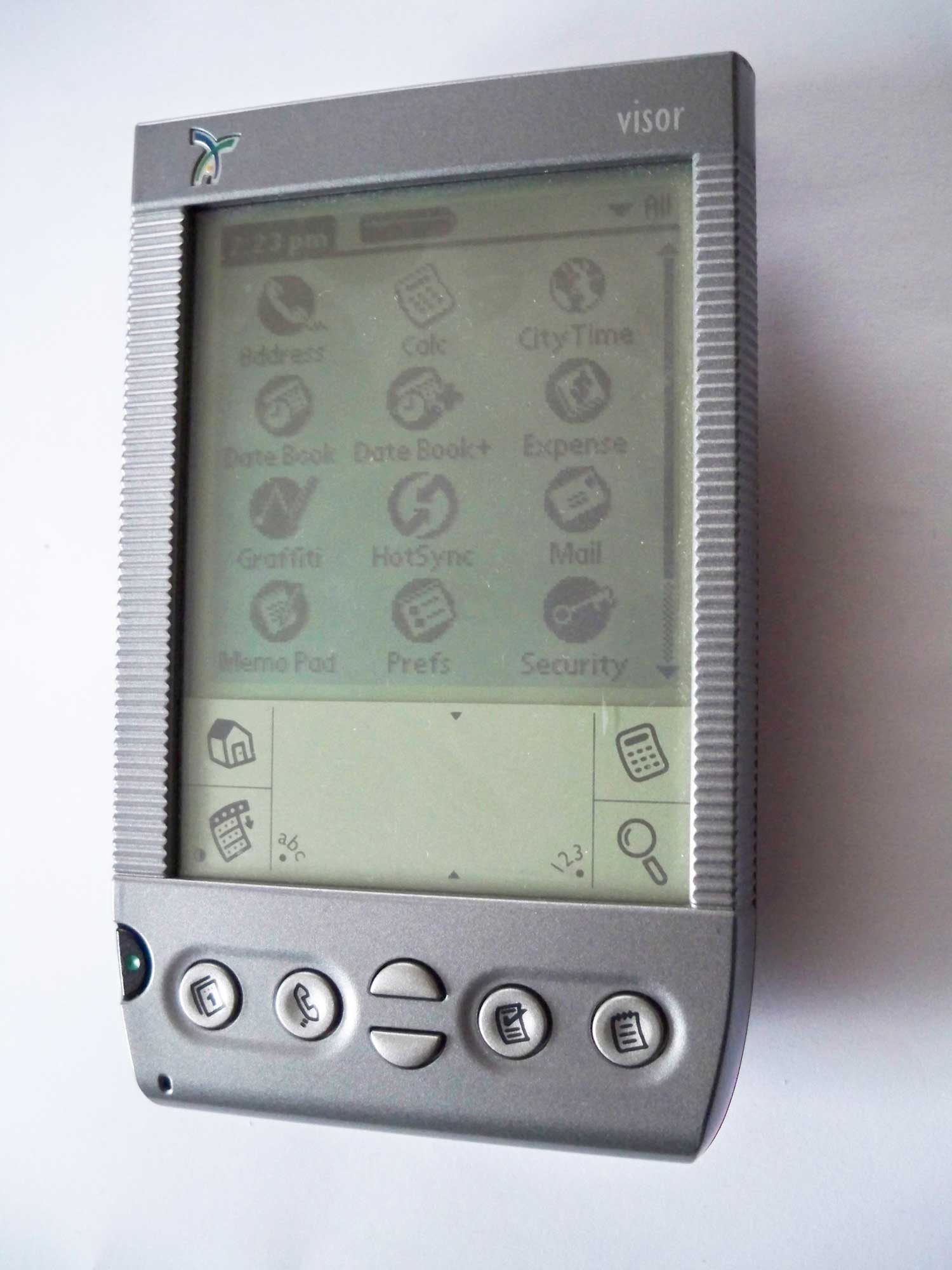
Handspring Visor Platinum

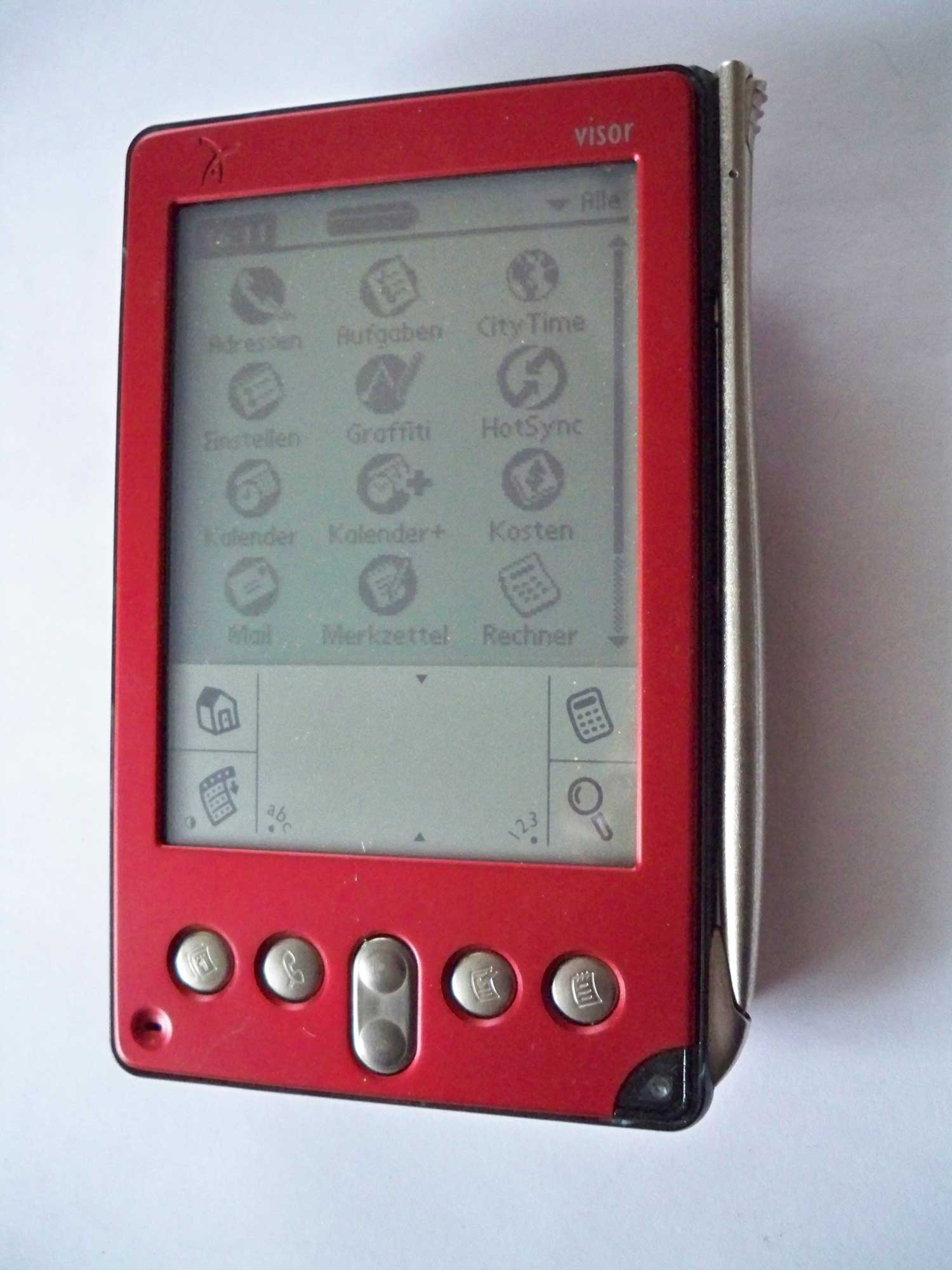
Handspring Visor Edge Red

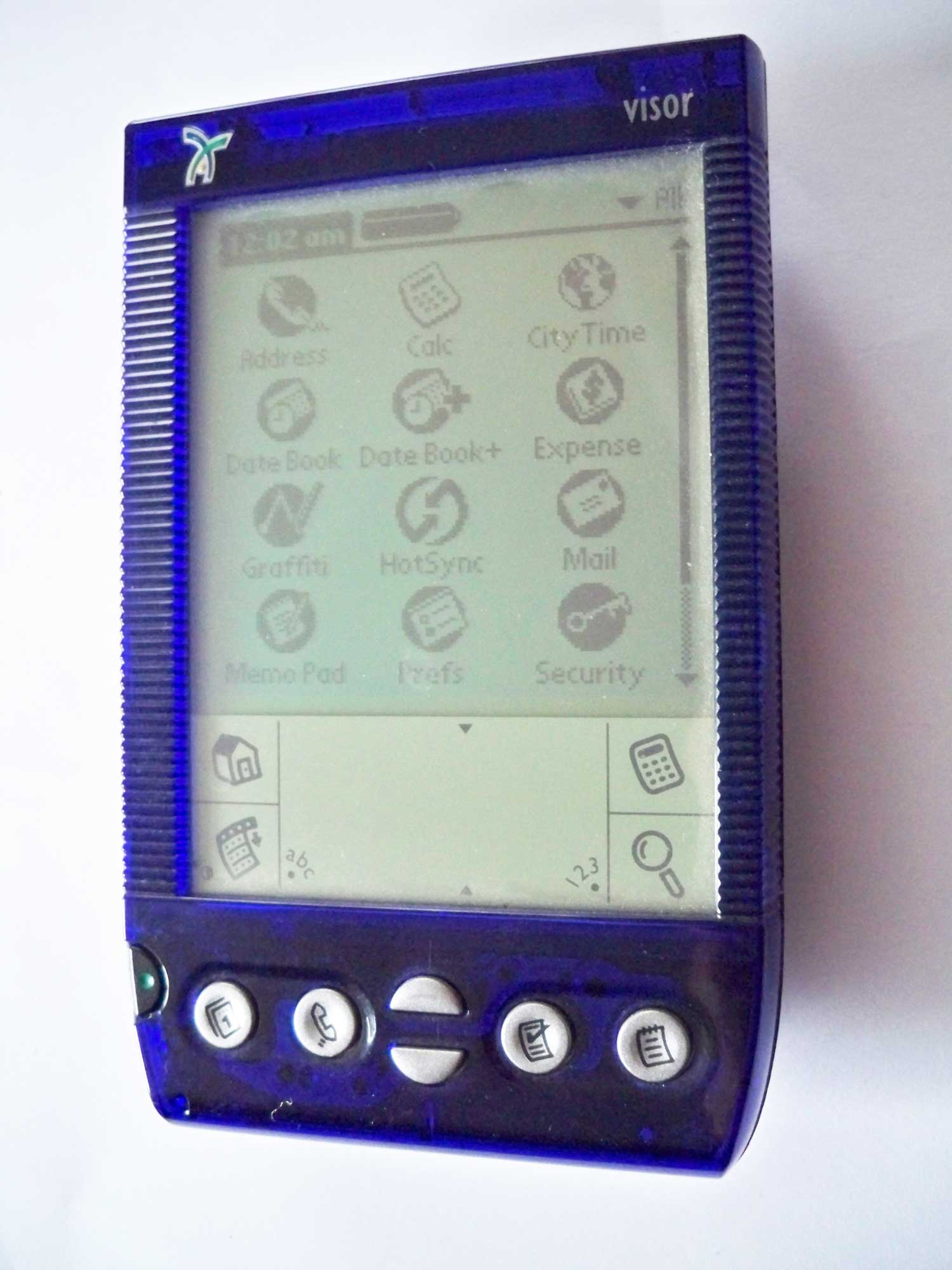
Handspring Visor Neo Blue

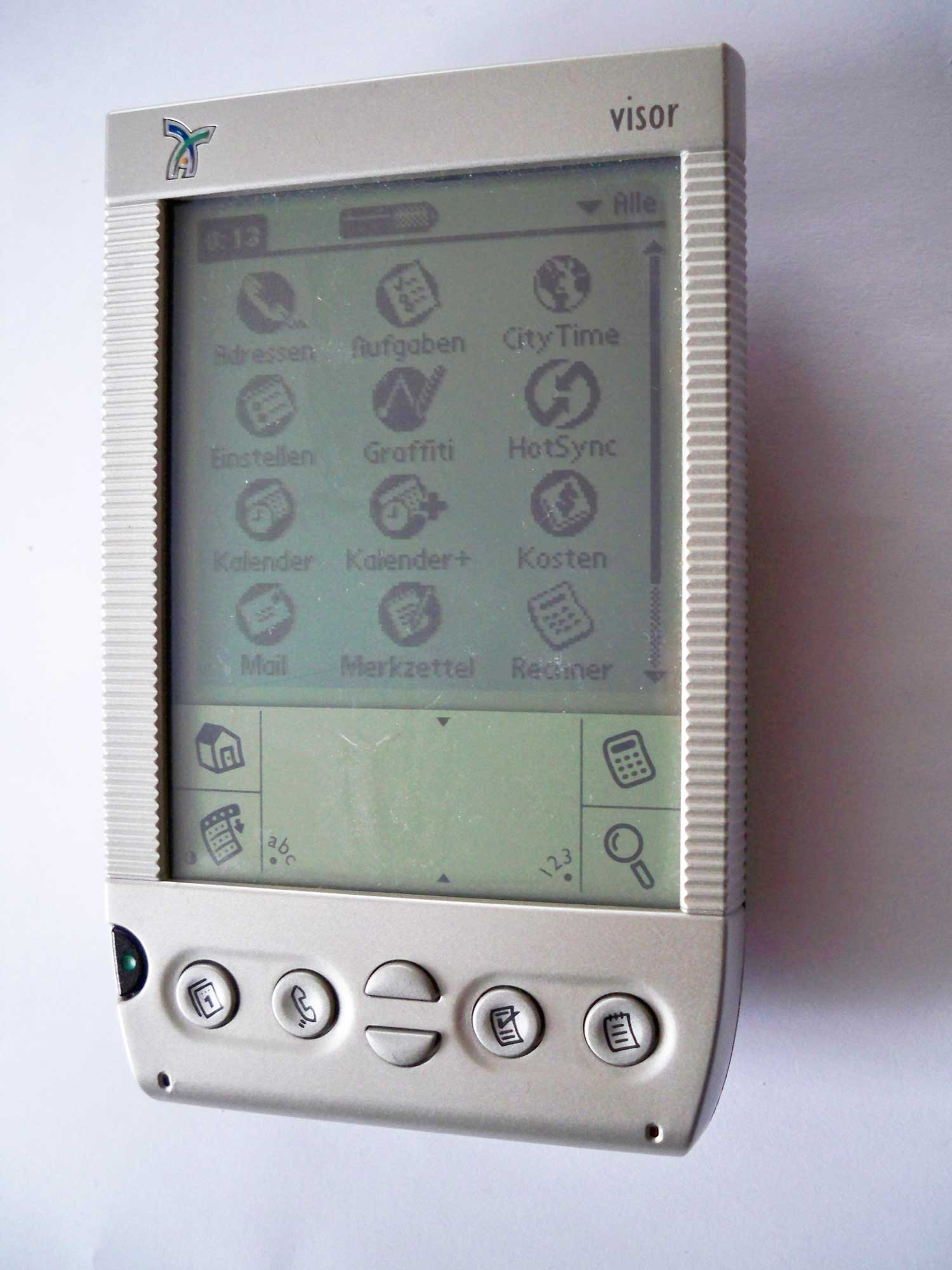
Handspring Visor Pro

=== Handspring Treo ===
In early 2002, Handspring ceased production of the Visor line, replacing it with a line of handhelds that were to be more "communication-centric" in nature; these would be sold under the name Treo. Except for the Treo 90, all Treo devices were smartphones with integrated cellular phones, and nearly all featured built-in keyboards to enhance e-mail and SMS functionality. The Treo line met with success, attributed in large part to Handspring's in-house VisorPhone software, which was tightly integrated with the Palm OS. The Springboard feature was no longer available on the Treo line, with Handspring favoring slimmer designs that left no room for the large slots necessary to support Springboard cartridges; peripheral technologies such as SDIO would soon render the Springboard platform obsolete. Additionally, technological advances meant that much of the functionality provided by Springboard modules, such as additional memory, a camera, MP3 player, Wi-Fi antenna, and GPS, could now be integrated into the handheld itself at reduced cost.

==== Treo 180 / 180g ====
The first models of the series, the Treo 180 and 180g were released in February 2002 as monochrome-screen GSM phones; the 180 had an integrated thumb keyboard, while the 180g had a Graffiti writing area in lieu of the keyboard.

==== Treo 90 ====
Handspring followed the Treo 180 with the Treo 90 in April 2002. The Treo 90 was the only Treo that was not a smartphone, as it did not have mobile telephony capabilities. At the time of release, it was the physically smallest Palm OS device on the market. The Treo 90 pioneered features such as a color screen and an SD card slot, which are found on all subsequent Treo models.

==== Treo 270 / Treo 300 ====
The Treo 270 and Treo 300 were twin models; the former worked using GSM networks, while the latter was a CDMA phone, released by Sprint Corporation.

==== Treo 600 ====
The Treo 600 was the first Treo to be rebranded as a Palm, Inc., product after Palm's acquisition of Handspring, as the PalmOne Treo 600. At the time, the GSM version of the phone was one of the few quad-band phones available in the United States.

==== Gallery ====
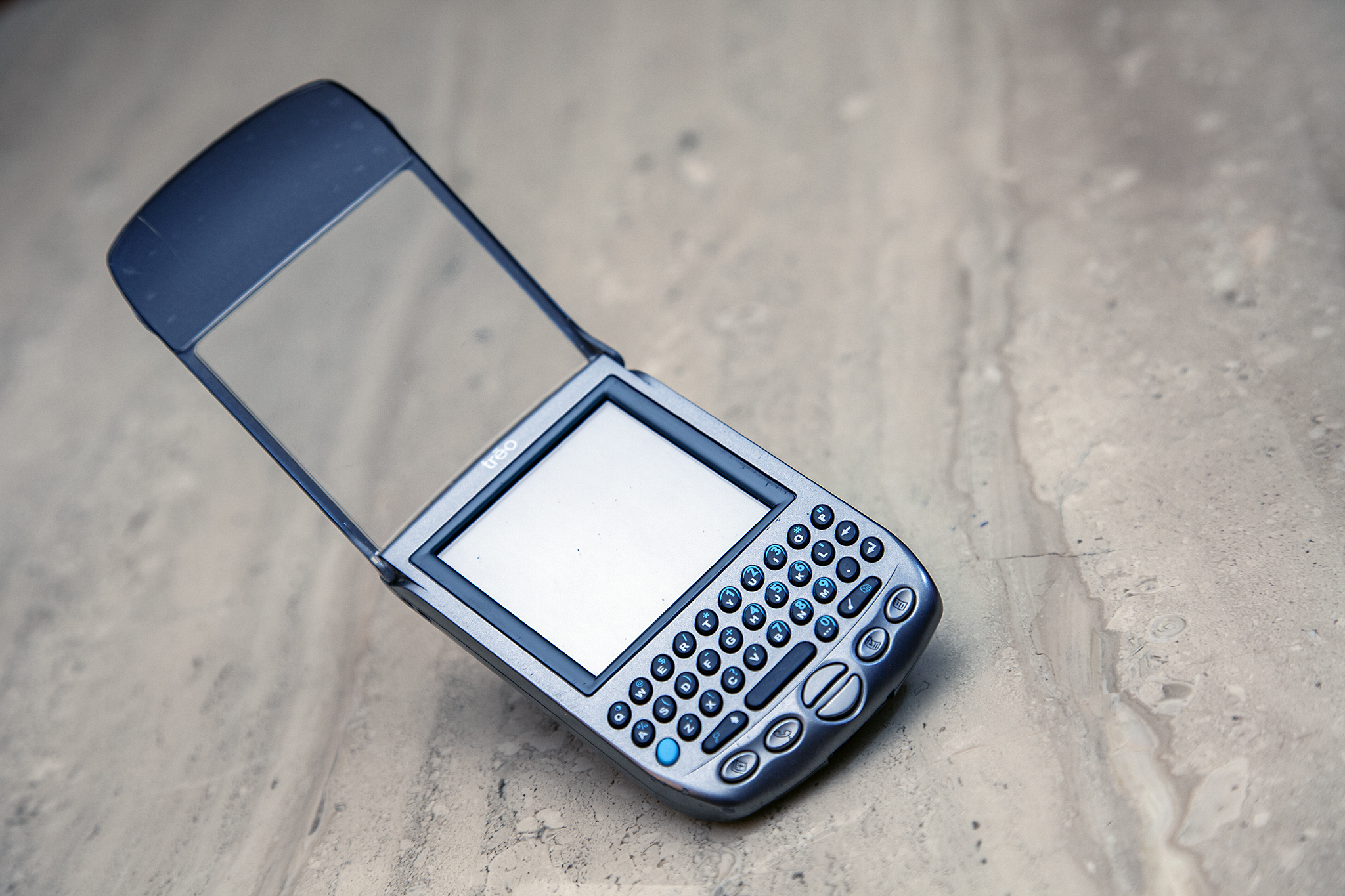
Treo 90

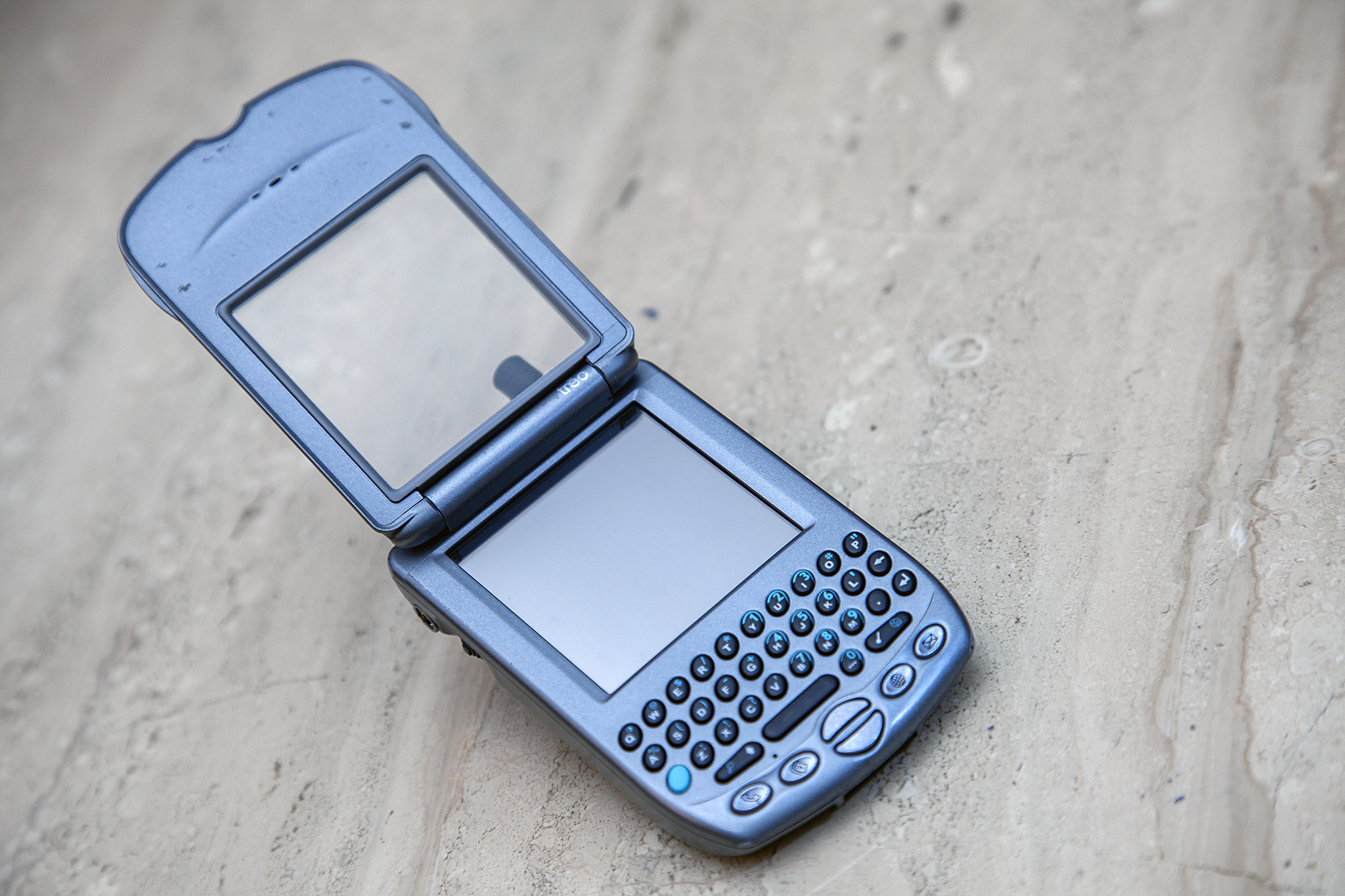
Treo 270

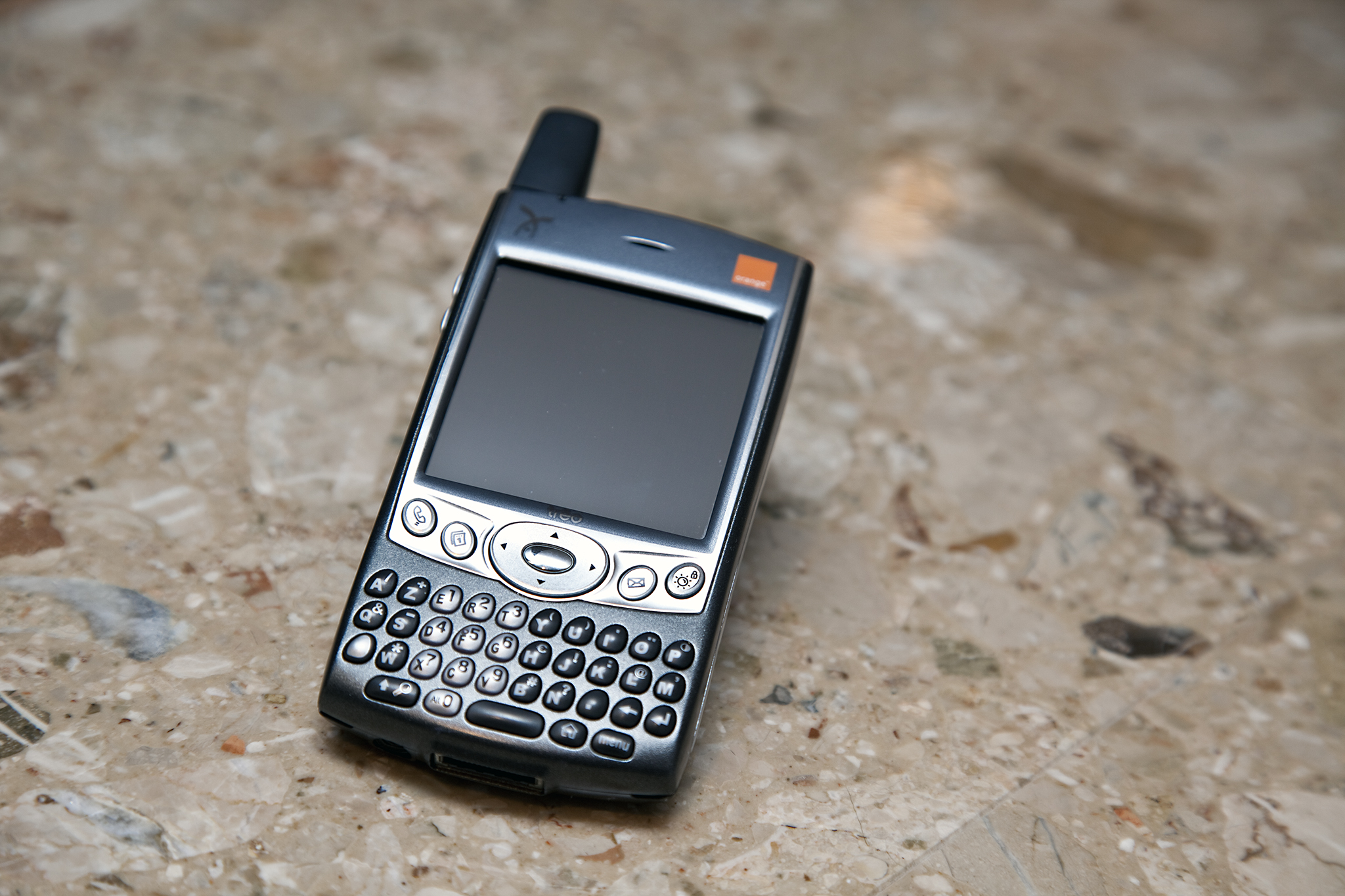
Treo 600
