= Treo 180 =

- Manufacturer: Handspring
- Type: Smartphone
- Media: 16 MB internal RAM
- Operating system: Palm OS 3.5.2H
- CPU: 33 MHz Dragonball
- Display: 160x160 pixels, monochrome 16 shades
- Input: Touchscreen miniature QWERTY keyboard
- Touchpad: Entire screen
- Connectivity: Infrared, USB (SDIO)
- Power: Proprietary non-removable rechargeable Li-ion battery
- Dimensions: 4.25 x 2.8 x 0.83 in.
- Successor: Treo 180g

The Treo 180 is a dual-band GSM smartphone made by Handspring. Released in 2002, it was the first device in the Treo family. Internet access was available using the Blazer browser.

It features a full keyboard and shipped with Palm OS version 3.5.2H. The 180 has a 160x160 monochrome screen, 16 MB of internal memory and a 33 MHz Dragonball CPU. Two main models were produced, the 180 with a thumb-type keyboard and the 180g which used the Graffiti handwriting recognition software, both were flip form factor.

== See also ==
- List of Palm OS Devices
- Palm Treo
- Palm OS
