= Springboard expansion slot =

Expansion port for personal digital assistants

Springboard
- Type: Expansion port

Production history
- Manufacturer: Handspring

The Springboard expansion slot is an expansion port for the Handspring brand of personal digital assistants (PDAs) that ran Palm OS. This socket accepted many different modules with varying functionality including cell phone telecommunications, Wi-Fi connectivity, MP3 player hardware, Global Positioning System reception, a digital camera, external storage, and software otherwise too large to fit into the PDA's internal memory.
