= Non-molestation order =

Injunction that protects victims of abuse or harassment

A non-molestation order is, in English law, a type of injunction that may be sought by a victim of domestic abuse against their abuser. It is one of two types of injunction available under Part IV of the Family Law Act 1996, the other being an occupation order. A non-molestation order is aimed at stopping harassment from a partner or ex-partner and also applies to any children that a victim of abuse may have. A breach of such an order is considered a criminal offence in English law.

== See also ==
- Injunctions in English law
