= Springboard injunction =

Type of court order in English and Welsh law

A springboard injunction is a specific type of court order issued under English and Welsh law.

The classic, albeit very wide, definition of the springboard injunction was given by Roxburgh J in Terrapin Ltd v Builders' Supply Co (Hayes) Ltd [1967] RPC 375, namely that it is an injunction whereby a party is: "placed under a special disability in the field of competition in order to ensure that he does not get an unfair start". The underlying legal principle is referred to in this case as the "springboard principle", and in the later Attorney-General v Observer Ltd. case (1990) as the "springboard doctrine". Unlike other forms of injunction, its purpose is to prevent a person gaining an unfair advantage as a result of earlier unlawful activity, not preventing future unlawful activity.

The springboard injunction mainly involved cases where former employees threaten to abuse confidential information acquired during the currency of their employment. In an employment context a leading case is that of Roger Bullivant v. Ellis, which arose because Mr Ellis, Bullivant’s managing director, had taken confidential information with him when he left the company to set up a rival business.

However, springboard injunction has been applied to the pharmaceutical industry. See Abbott GmbH & Co KG and Another v. Pharmareg Consulting Co Ltd and Another (17/04/2009, HCA166/2009) [2009] 3 HKLRD 524. In that case, the defendant had infringed Abbott's patent by importing samples of a drug to secure a product registration while the patent was still in force. Shortly before the patent's expiration, Abbott sought to extend an injunction to prevent the defendant from launching their generic product. The Hong Kong High Court granted the springboard injunction, prohibiting the defendant from selling their product for an additional nine months after the patent had expired.

The court's rationale was that the defendant should not be allowed to benefit from the head start gained by its infringement. It reasoned that the post-expiry nature of the injunction did not alter the standard legal test, and that the balance of convenience favored the patentee, who would suffer irreparable harm from a premature generic launch, whereas the generic company's potential losses were quantifiable and could be covered by damages. This decision affirmed that patentees in Hong Kong can take pre-emptive action to neutralize any unfair advantage gained by a competitor's unlawful conduct during the patent term.

== Requirements ==
Springboard injunctions must meet the pre-requisite conditions that are standard for the granting of injunctions, however, there are additional criteria that the court must be satisfied with before this particular type of relief will be awarded:

- There must be a misuse of confidential information by the former employee and/or past breaches of contract by either the former employee or others they might be acting in concert with (UBS Wealth Management (UK) Ltd & Another v Vestra Wealth LLP & Oth [2008] EWHC 1974 ).
- The former employee(s) must have an unfair advantage as a result of the breaches of contract and the unfair advantage must still exist at the time the injunction is sought (Sun Valley Foods Ltd v Vincent [2000] FSR 825).
- There must be a risk of future economic loss to the former employer which is caused by the former employee's unfair advantage.
- The sole and intended purpose of the injunction is to protect against future losses; not to punish previous breaches by the former employee.
- The seriousness of the breach of the former employee's conduct cannot have any bearing on the period for which the injunction should be granted. The court will only consider the effect of the breach upon the former employer in the sense of the extent to which the former employee has gained as an illegitimate advantage (Sectrack NV v Satamatics Ltd [2007] EWHC 3003).

== Duration ==
A springboard advantage cannot last indefinitely and therefore a springboard injunction usually applies for a specific period. In the Bullivant case referred to above, the injunction was applied "until judgment or further order".
