= Occupation order =

Injunction that regulates who may reside in a home

An occupation order is a type of injunction in English law. It is one of two types of injunction available under the Family Law Act 1996, the other being a non-molestation order. An occupation order is used to regulate who can live in the family home.
