= Samsung Gear =

Line of wearable computing devices

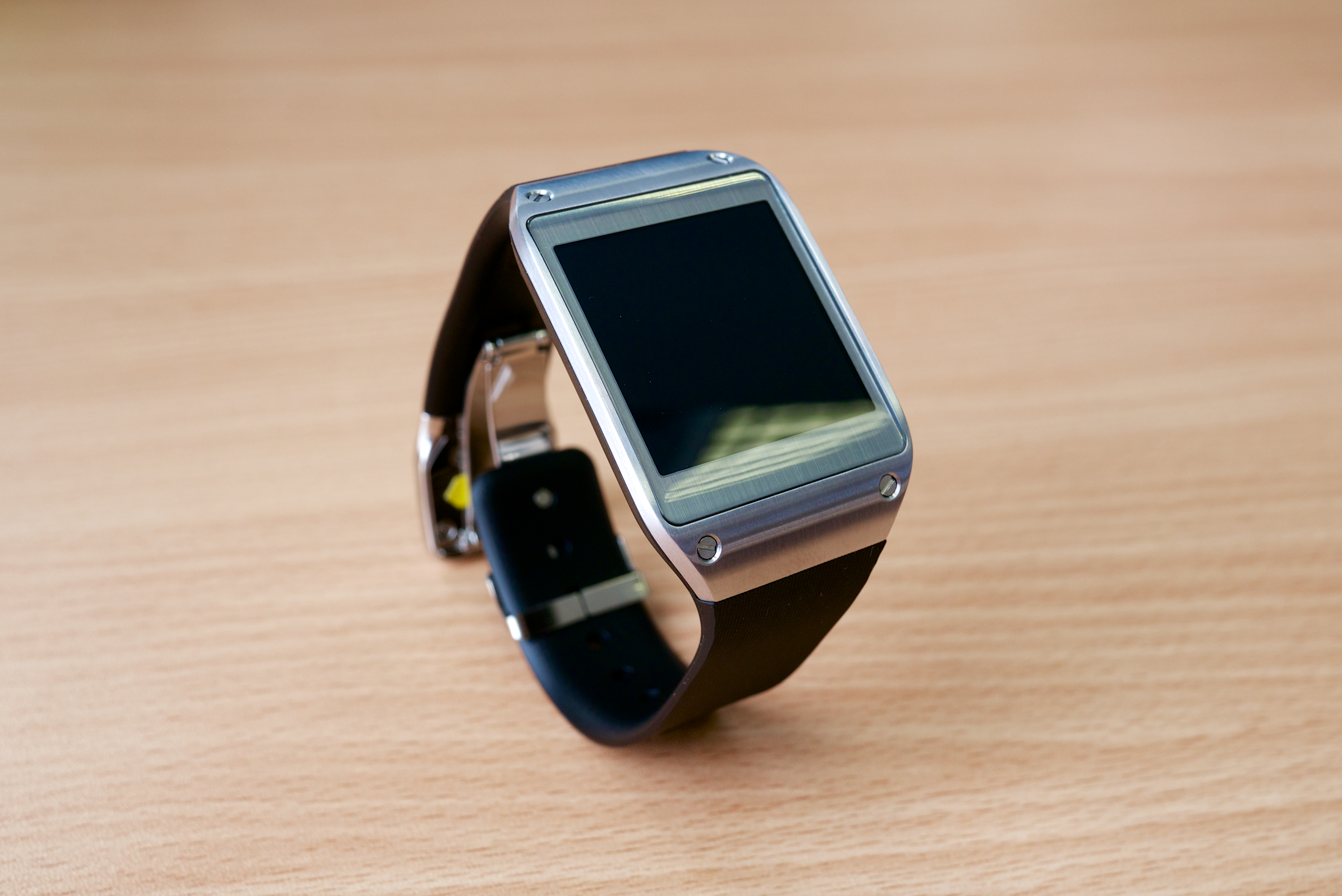
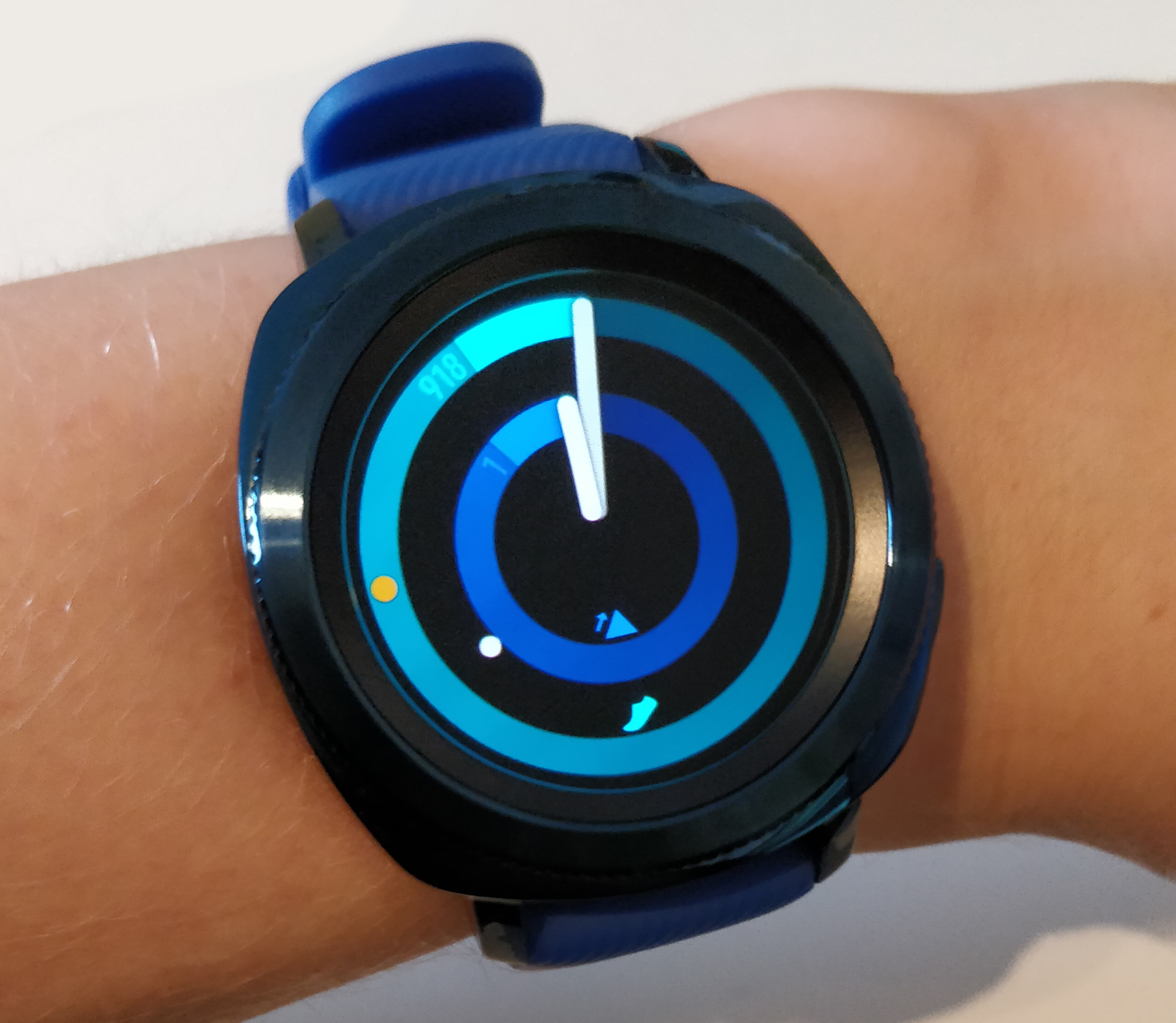
- Samsung Galaxy Gear Samsung Gear Sport
- Developer: Samsung Electronics
- Type: Smartwatches; Fitness trackers Wireless earbuds
- Released: September 4, 2013; 13 years ago
- Discontinued: February 20, 2019; 7 years ago
- Successor: Samsung Galaxy Watch series Samsung Galaxy Fit series Samsung Galaxy Buds series
- Related: Samsung Galaxy

Samsung Gear (Korean: 삼성 기어) was a line of wearable computing devices produced by Samsung Electronics. The first device in the series, the Galaxy Gear smartwatch, was announced in 2013. Since then, the line has expanded to include fitness bands and earbuds, as well as more smartwatches.

Although the first device (Galaxy Gear) was named after the Galaxy brand, Samsung did not name its subsequent devices under the "Galaxy", simply using the prefix "Gear". February 2019, Samsung re-branded smartwatches, fitness bands, and earbuds under the Galaxy brand (Galaxy Watch, Galaxy Fit, Galaxy Buds). Samsung shipped approximately 31 million wearable devices in 2019, including 7.4 million true wireless earbuds.

Samsung Gear series release timeline
2013	Samsung Galaxy Gear
2014	Samsung Gear 2
2014	Samsung Gear 2 Neo
2014	Samsung Gear Fit
2014	Samsung Gear Live
2014	Samsung Gear S
2014	Samsung Gear Circle
2015	Samsung Gear VR
2015	Samsung Gear S2
2016	Samsung Gear 360
2016	Samsung Gear Fit 2
2016	Samsung Gear IconX
2016	Samsung Gear S3
2017	Samsung Gear 360 2017
2017	Samsung Gear Sport
2017	Samsung Gear Fit 2 Pro
2017	Samsung Gear IconX 2018

== Watches ==
Product	Model	Launch date	SoC	Wireless	Display	OS	Storage / Memory	Battery size
Galaxy Gear	SM-V700	September 23, 2013	Exynos 4212 1x 800 MHz		1.63" Super AMOLED (320x320)	Android, Tizen	4GB/512 MB RAM	315 mAh
Gear 2	SM-R380; SM-R381 (Neo)	February 22, 2014	Exynos 3250 1x 1 GHz		1.63" Super AMOLED (320x320)	Tizen	4GB/512 MB RAM	300 mAh
Gear Live	SM-R382	June 25, 2014	Snapdragon 400 4x 1 GHz	BCM4334W (Wi-Fi/BT)	1.63" Super AMOLED (320x320)	Android Wear	4GB/512 MB RAM	300 mAh
Gear S	SM-R750 (Cellular); SM-R750J; SM-R750A/B/D/P/T/V/W (cellular)	November 7, 2014	Exynos 4212 4x 1 GHz; Snapdragon 400 4x 1 GHz; Snapdragon 400 4x 1 GHz		2.0" curved Super AMOLED (360x480)	Tizen	4GB/512 MB RAM	300 mAh
Gear S2	SM-R720 (BT/Wi-Fi); SM-R730 (Cellular); SM-R732 (Classic; BT/Wi-Fi)	October 2, 2015	Exynos 3250 2x Cortex-A7 1 GHz	BCM4343 (Wi-Fi/BT)	1.2" circular Super AMOLED (360x360)	Tizen	4GB/512 MB RAM	250 mAh; 300 mAh; 250 mAh
Gear S3	SM-R760 (Frontier; BT/Wi-Fi); SM-R765 (Frontier; Cellular); SM-R770 (Classic; BT/Wi-Fi)	November 18, 2016	Exynos 7270 2x Cortex-A53 1 GHz		1.3" circular Super AMOLED (360x360)	Tizen	4GB/768 MB RAM	380 mAh
Gear Sport	SM-R600	October 27, 2017	Exynos 7270 2x Cortex-A53 1 GHz	BCM4752 (GNSS)	1.2" circular Super AMOLED (360x360)	Tizen	4GB/768 MB RAM	300 mAh

== Fitness bands ==
Product	Model	Launch date	SoC	Wireless	Display	OS	Storage / RAM	Battery size
Gear Fit	SM-R350	April 11, 2014	STM32F439ZI CM4 180 MHz	BCM4334W (Wi-Fi/Bluetooth)	1.84" curved Super AMOLED display (432x128)	RTOS	4GB	200 mAh
Gear Fit 2	SM-R360	June 2, 2016	Exynos 3250 2xA7 1 GHz	BCM43436 (Wi-Fi/Bluetooth) + BCM4774 (GNSS)	1.5" curved Super AMOLED (432x216)	Tizen	4GB/512 MB	200 mAh
Gear Fit 2 Pro	SM-R365	October 26, 2017	Exynos 3250 2xA7 1 GHz	BCM43436 (Wi-Fi/Bluetooth) + BCM4774 (GNSS)	1.5" curved Super AMOLED (432x216)	Tizen	4GB/512 MB	200 mAh

== Earbuds ==
Product	Model	Launch date	Audio processor	Wireless	Codec	Mics	Internal storage	Battery life
Gear IconX	SM-R150	July 15, 2016	On-Semi LC823450	BCM43436 (BT4.2)	On-Semi	2 per bud	4 GB	1.6 hours
Gear IconX (2018)	SM-R140	October 27, 2017	On-Semi LC823450	BCM43013 (BT4.2)	On-Semi	2 per bud	3.4 GB	5 hours

== Other devices ==
- Samsung Gear VR – virtual reality device
- Samsung Gear 360 – 360-degree video camera
- Samsung Gear Circle – smart neck band
