= Samsung Gear S =

Smartwatch

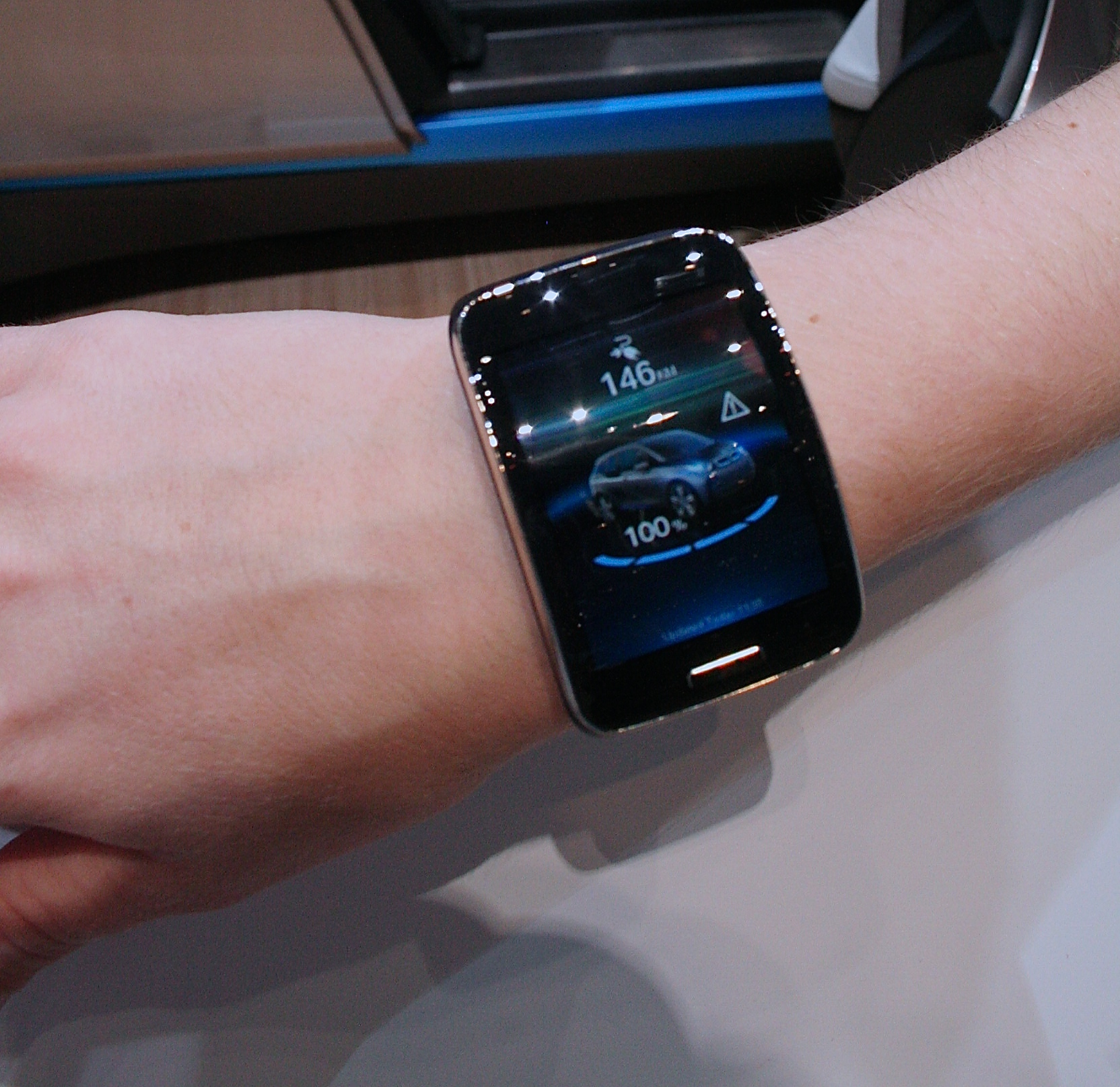
- Developer: Samsung Electronics
- Manufacturer: Samsung
- Product family: Gear
- Type: Smartwatch
- Released: November 7, 2014
- Operating system: Tizen, Android (root only)
- System on a chip: MSM8226 Snapdragon 400 processor
- CPU: Quad-core ARM Cortex-A7 (1.0 GHz)
- Memory: 512 MB
- Storage: 4 GB
- Display: 2.0 in (51 mm) Curved Super AMOLED with RGB matrix 360×480 pixels (4:3 aspect ratio)
- Graphics: Adreno 305 (200 MHz)
- Input: Multi-touch, Accelerometer, Gyroscope, Compass, Heart Rate monitor, Ambient Light sensor, UV sensor and Barometer
- Connectivity: Bluetooth low energy, 3G, Wi-Fi
- Power: 300mAh
- Online services: Samsung Apps
- Predecessor: Samsung Gear 2
- Successor: Samsung Gear S2

Samsung Gear S is a smartwatch designed and marketed by Samsung Electronics. It was announced on August 28, 2014, as the successor to the Samsung Gear 2 and was released on November 7, 2014. The smartwatch can be modified to run Android 5.1.1 or Wear OS 6.0.1.

Its successor, the Samsung Gear S2, was released on October 2, 2015.

== Specifications ==
=== Hardware ===
The Gear S is similar to older versions of the Samsung Galaxy Gear although it does come with some new additions. The Samsung Gear S has a curved 2.0 inch Super AMOLED screen at 360×480 pixels. It has a Quad Core 1.0 GHz processor (limited at two running cores from factory) and runs the Tizen operating system. As with the Galaxy Gear 2, the Gear S includes 512 MB RAM and 4 GB internal storage as well as a 300 mAh Li-ion battery.

Using a 3G module the watch itself is able to connect to the Internet, make phone calls and send SMSs without needing a phone. It was the first wearable device to include Wi-Fi, Bluetooth and 3G connectivity.

== See also ==
- Android Wear
- Apple Watch
- Microsoft Band
- Pebble
