= Samsung Gear Sport =

Smartwatch

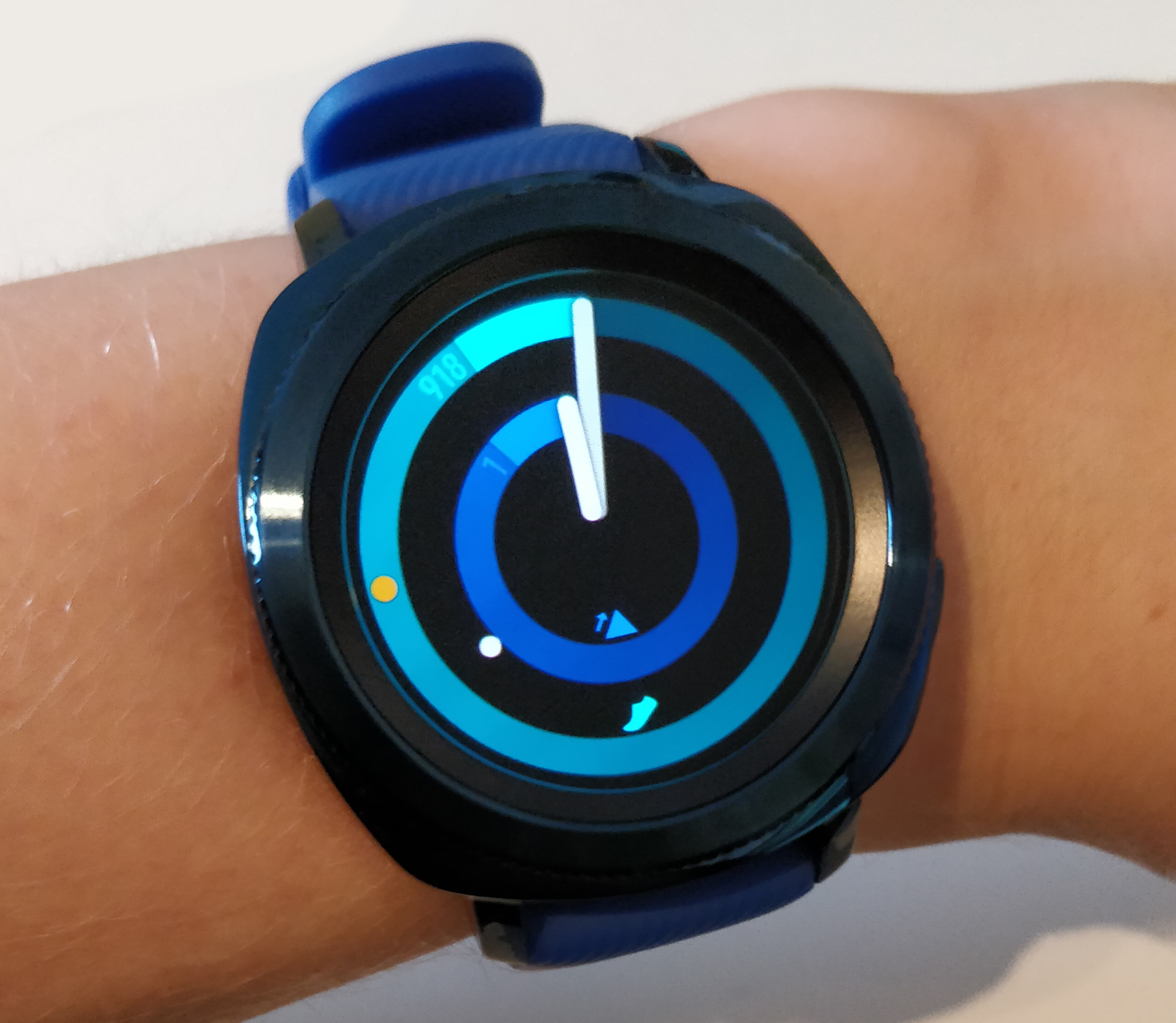
- Developer: Samsung Electronics
- Manufacturer: Samsung Electronics
- Product family: Samsung Gear series
- Type: Smartwatch
- Released: 2017
- Operating system: Tizen
- Predecessor: Samsung Gear S3
- Successor: Samsung Galaxy Watch

The Samsung Gear Sport is a smartwatch developed by Samsung Electronics. The Gear Sport was released at Samsung Galaxy Unpacked in 2017.

== Specifications ==
Model	Samsung Gear Sport	Ref.
Display	1.2” 360 x 360 Super AMOLED Full color AOD, Gorilla Glass3	
Operating System	Tizen 3.0 (updateable to 4.0.0.7 - One UI as of May 2019)	
Weight	67g	
RAM	768MB	
Storage	4GB	
Water Resistant	5ATM	
Connectivity	Bluetooth 4.2, Wi-Fi (802.11 b/g/n), GPS/Glonass, NFC	
Sensors	Accelerometer, Gyro Sensor, Barometer, Heart Rate Monitor, Ambient Light	
Battery	300mAh	
