= Samsung Gear Circle =

2014 smart neck band by Samsung Electronics

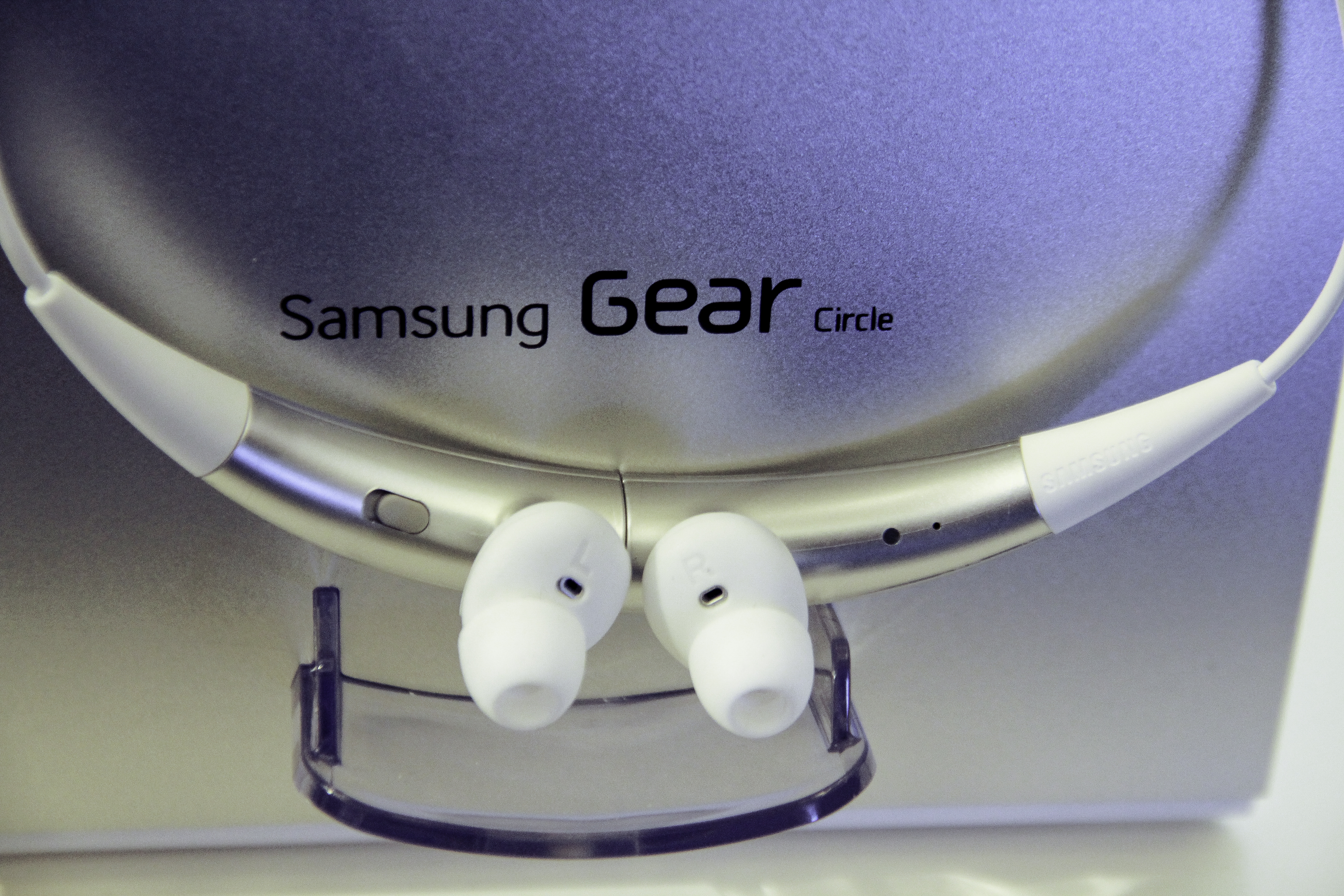
- Brand: Samsung
- Manufacturer: Samsung Electronics
- Series: Samsung Gear
- First released: November 5, 2014; 11 years ago
- Availability by region: November 5, 2014; 11 years ago
- Discontinued: August 2, 2016; 10 years ago
- Successor: Samsung Gear IconX
- Dimensions: Height x Width x Thickness 610mm
- Weight: 28 g (1 oz)
- Battery: Built-in Lithium-ion battery 180 mAh
- Display: LED Indicator
- Sound: Sound Alive; Apt-X; Samsung HD; SBC
- Connectivity: Bluetooth 3.0
- Data inputs: Magnetic Sensor; Touch Sensor (Volume Control)
- Model: SM-R130

Samsung Gear Circle is a Bluetooth earphone manufactured, developed and designed by Samsung Electronics as part of the Samsung Gear series. It was announced on September 3, 2014 at Samsung Unpacked 2014 Episode 2, alongside the Galaxy Note 4, the Galaxy Note Edge, the Gear S and the Gear VR. It was released on November 5, 2014, and its advantage is its lightness.
