= Samsung Gear S3 =

2016 smartwatch by Samsung Electronics

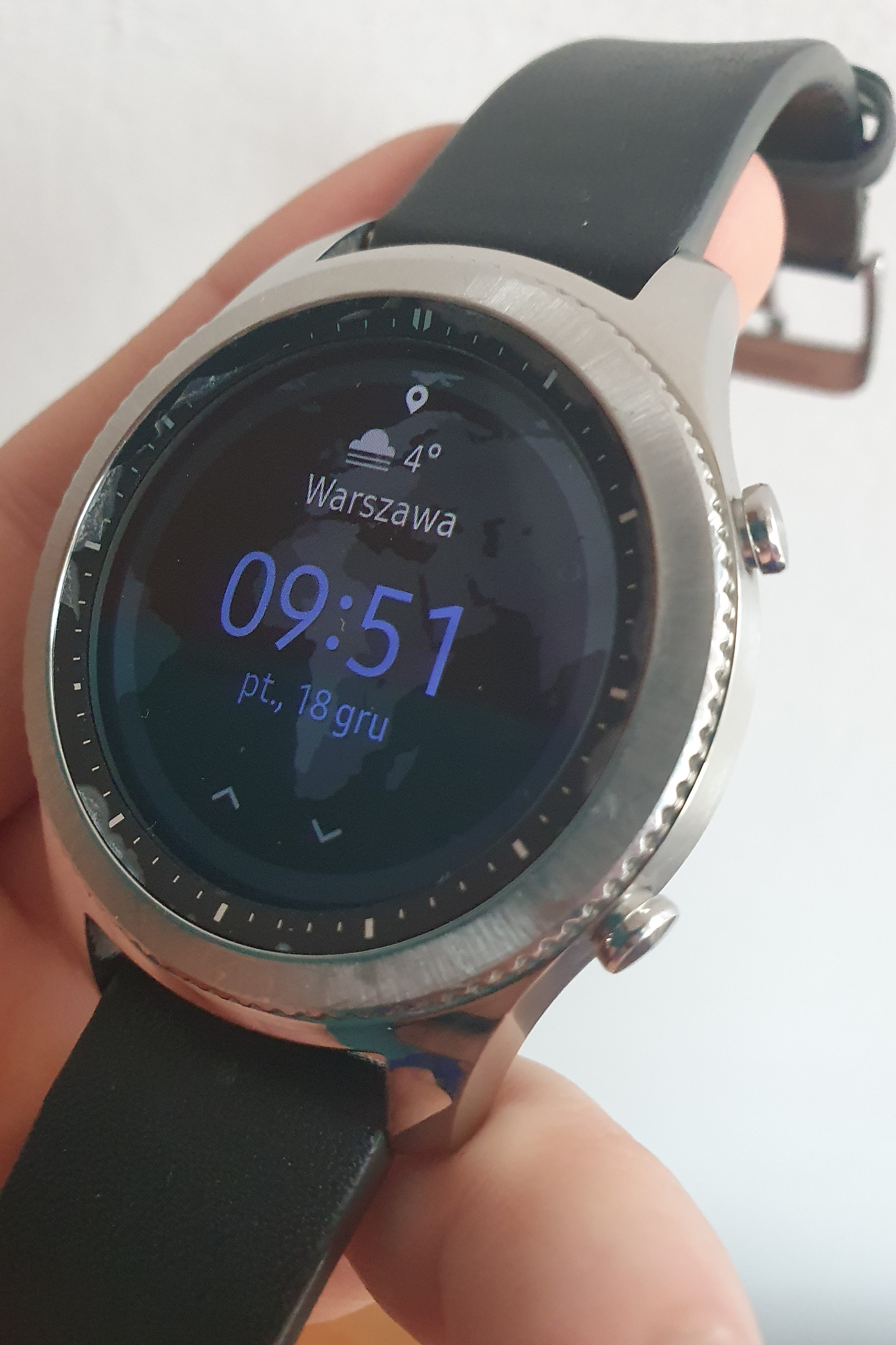
- Samsung Gear S3 Classic
- Brand: Samsung
- Manufacturer: Samsung Electronics
- Type: Smartwatch
- Family: Samsung Gear
- First released: November 18, 2016; 9 years ago
- Availability by region: November 18, 2016; 9 years ago
- Discontinued: August 9, 2018; 7 years ago
- Predecessor: Samsung Gear S2
- Successor: Samsung Galaxy Watch
- Related: Samsung Gear Sport
- Compatible networks: 2G / 3G / 4G
- Operating system: Original: Tizen 2.3.2; Current: Tizen 4.0.0.7 with One UI Watch 1.0
- Battery: 380 mAh, Qi inductive coil wireless charging
- Display: 1.3" Super AMOLED, 360 x 360 pixels
- Data inputs: Capacitive touch
- Website: Gear S3

The Samsung Gear S3 is a Tizen-based circular smartwatch manufactured, developed and designed by Samsung Electronics. It was announced on August 31, 2016 and released on November 18, 2016.

There are two models of the Gear S3, Classic and Frontier. The Classic has a silver watch case and black leather band, while the Frontier has a black watch case and rubber band. Both are rated IP68 (water resistant) and have GPS and heart rate monitor sensors. One notable feature is that the bezel ring rotates as part of the user interface, although users can also navigate by swiping the screen and/or using the two buttons on the side.

The Gear S3's successor, the Samsung Galaxy Watch, was released August 9, 2018.

== Comparison of models ==
Model	Gear S3 Frontier (Bluetooth)	Gear S3 Frontier (LTE)	Gear S3 Classic (Bluetooth)	Gear S3 Classic (LTE)
Display	1.3” Circular Super AMOLED, 360 x 360, 278ppi, Always-on display, Corning Gorilla Glass SR+			
Processor	Exynos 7270 Dual Core 1.0 GHz			
Operating System	Tizen Based Wearable Platform 4.0.0.7 Update Jun 2020			
Size	49 x 46 x 12.9			
Weight	62g	63g	59g	60g
Memory	4GB Internal memory, 768MB RAM			
Connectivity	Bluetooth 4.2, Wi-Fi b/g/n, NFC, MST, GPS/Glonass	3G/LTE, Bluetooth 4.2, Wi-Fi b/g/n, NFC, MST, A-GPS/Glonass	Bluetooth 4.2, Wi-Fi b/g/n, NFC, MST, GPS/Glonass	3G/LTE, Bluetooth 4.2, Wi-Fi b/g/n, NFC, MST, A-GPS/Glonass
Sensors	Accelerometer, Gyro, Barometer, HRM, Ambient light, Speedometer			
Battery	380 mAh Li-ion battery			
Charging Technology	Wireless charging (WPC Inductive)			
Part No.	SM-R760	SM-R765	SM-R770	SM-R775

The "LTE" models are further divided into sub-models depending on the target country and Service Provider cellular infrastructure available.

Model	Target Country	Service Providers	LTE Support	LTE Band (Frequency)	UMTS Support	UTMS Band (Frequency)
SM-R765A	USA	AT&T	LTE	B2 (1900 PCS), B4 (1700/2100 AWS 1), B5 (850) & B17 (700 bc)	UMTS	B1 (2100), B2 (1900 PCS) & B5 (850)
SM-R765F	Singapore	Singtel & Starhub	LTE, LTE 100/50 & LTE 150/50	B1 (2100), B3 (1800 +) & B5 (850)	UMTS, HSUPA, HSUPA 5.8 & HSDPA	B1 (2100)
SM-R765L	Korea		LTE, LTE 100/50 & LTE 150/50	B5 (850)		
SM-R765N	New Zealand	Spark			3G WCDMA	B5 (850)
SM-R765S	Korea		LTE	B5 (850)		
SM-R765T	USA	T-Mobile	LTE	B2 (1900 PCS), B4 (1700/2100 AWS 1) & B5 (850)	UMTS	B1 (2100), B2 (1900 PCS), B4 (1700/2100 AWS 1) & B5 (850)
SM-R765V	USA	Verizon	LTE, LTE 100/50 & LTE 150/50	B4 (1700/2100 AWS 1) & B13 (700 c)		
SM-R775S	Korea		LTE	B5 (850)		

== See also ==
- Samsung Galaxy
