= Samsung Gear 2 =

2014 Smartwatch by Samsung Electronics

Samsung Gear 2 Samsung Gear 2 Neo
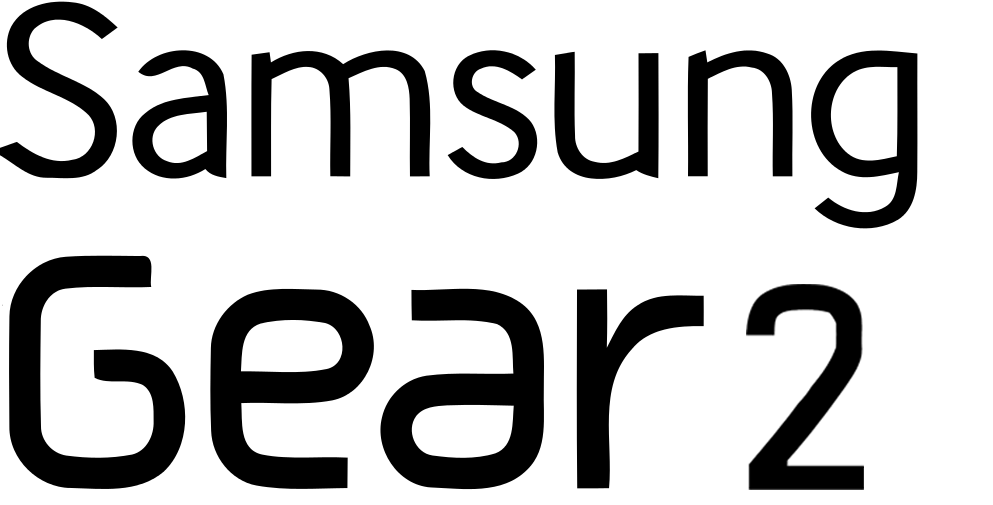

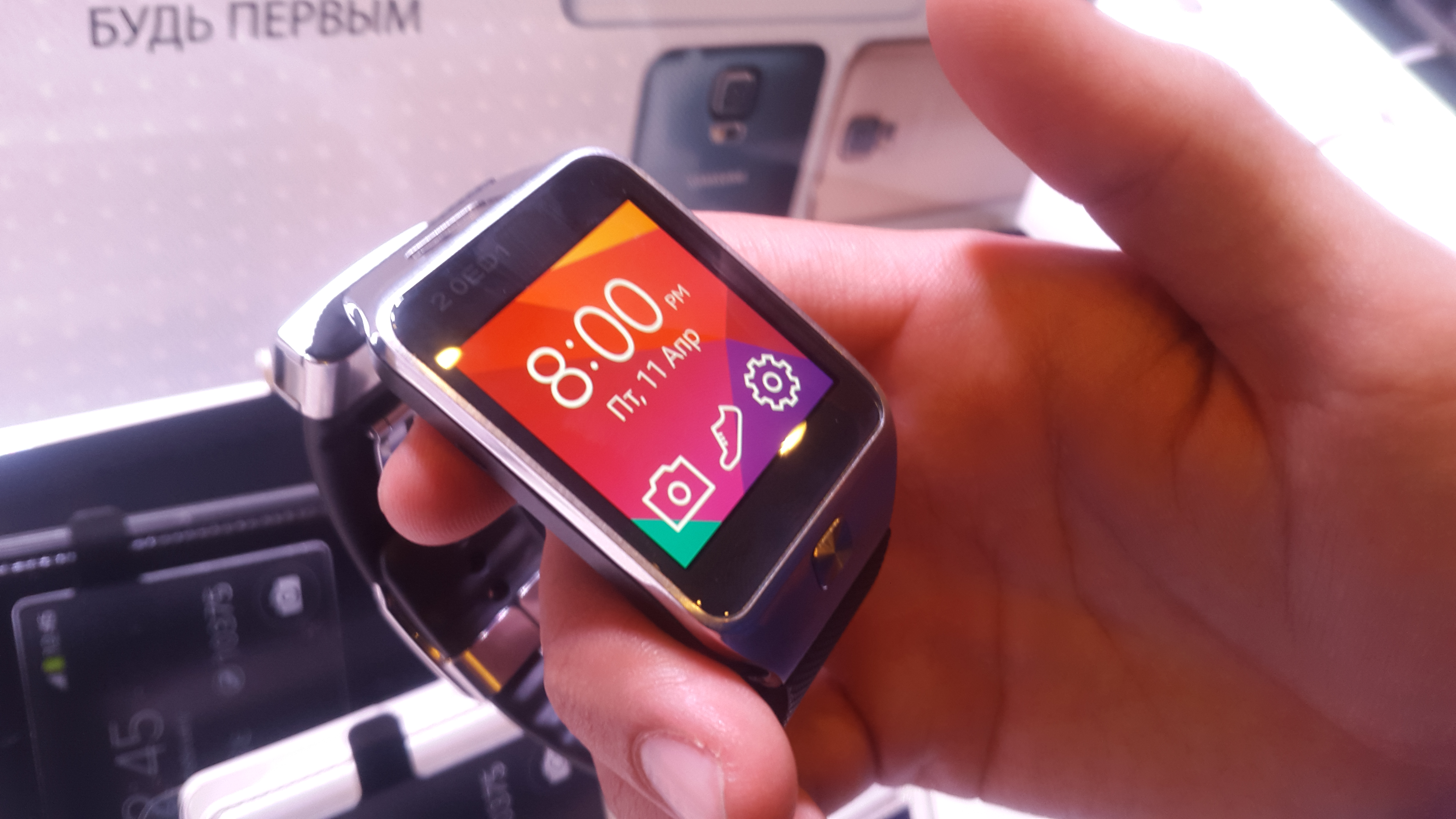
- Samsung Gear 2
- Also known as: Samsung Optima
- Brand: Samsung
- Manufacturer: Samsung Electronics
- Type: Watch phone
- Family: Samsung Gear
- First released: April 11, 2014; 12 years ago
- Availability by region: April 11, 2014; 12 years ago
- Predecessor: Samsung Galaxy Gear
- Successor: Samsung Gear S
- Related: Samsung Gear Fit
- Operating system: Tizen
- System-on-chip: Exynos 3250
- CPU: 1.0 GHz dual-core
- Memory: 512 MB
- Storage: 4 GB
- Rear camera: 2 MP, BSI, 720p video recording
- Display: 1.63 in (41 mm) Super AMOLED with RGB matrix 320×320 pixels (1:1 Aspect ratio)
- Sound: NGT 2000 (9000 Hz)
- Connectivity: Bluetooth low energy, Infrared
- Data inputs: Optimus Touchpad
- Codename: Rinato

The Samsung Gear 2 and Samsung Gear 2 Neo are smartwatches manufactured, developed and produced by Samsung Electronics. They were announced on February 24, 2014 at the Samsung Unpacked for the Mobile World Congress alongside the Galaxy S5 and the Gear Fit, and released on April 11, 2014. The Gear 2 line is a successor to the Samsung Galaxy Gear.

In comparison to the Galaxy Gear, the most significant change made to the Gear 2 line was the replacement of Android with the Samsung-developed Tizen operating system, promising improved functionality (such as Samsung's S Health software and an integrated music player) and battery life. The design of the device itself was also refreshed with the move of its camera from the watchband to the watch itself (allowing users to replace their own bands), along with the addition of an infrared blaster and optical heart rate sensor.

Its successor, the Samsung Gear S, was released on November 7, 2014.

== Specifications ==
=== Hardware ===
The Gear 2 retains a similar hardware design to the original Galaxy Gear, although a Home button has been added below the screen, and the device's 2-megapixel camera was moved from the strap to the top of the watch itself, alongside a newly added infrared blaster. This particular design change allows the strap to be user-replaceable. Two models of the Gear 2 were released, the Gear 2 and Gear 2 Neo; the vanilla model has a steel exterior and includes a camera, while its Neo variant is made from plastic and excludes the camera. They are otherwise identical.

The device's processor was upgraded to a 1.0 GHz dual-core Exynos 3250 system-on-chip. As with the Galaxy Gear, the Gear 2 has a 1.63-inch, 320 pixel-wide square-shaped Super AMOLED touchscreen, 512 MB of RAM, and 4 GB of internal storage. An optical heart rate monitor is located on the bottom of the device. Despite having a smaller, 300 mAh battery, the Gear 2 has increased battery life over its predecessor, with Samsung rating it for 2–3 days of normal use. As with the previous model, the device itself does not contain a charging port and must be placed inside a special Micro USB-equipped charging case.

=== Software ===
Unlike the original Galaxy Gear, which ran Android, the Gear 2 runs Tizen, a Linux-based operating system co-developed by Samsung and Intel. The Gear 2 uses a similar user interface to the Galaxy Gear, allowing users to synchronize notifications from a host device and display them the Gear's screen when received, use Smart Relay to automatically open the relevant app for the notification on their smartphone or tablet, use S Voice for dictation and voice commands, place and answer phone calls, and locate the host phone or tablet, or vice versa with the "Find My Device" tool. Notable new apps added on the Gear 2 include the fitness app S Health, WatchOn—a remote control app which integrates with its infrared blaster, and an integrated music player which can store songs on the device's internal storage. As with the Galaxy Gear, an updated Gear Manager app is installed on the Galaxy device to coordinate communications, customize the watch and download apps from Samsung Apps. The Gear 2's Gear Manager adds the ability to customize which apps the watch displays notifications from, upload a custom wallpaper, and perform backups.

== Reception ==
The Gear 2 and Gear 2 Neo received mixed reviews. TechRadar considered the device to be a "much, much better attempt at making the smartwatch more relevant", with particular praise towards the streamlined design and ability to use custom watch straps, and its improved battery life, but panned the high cost of the device and its "convoluted" user interface.
