= Samsung Gear S2 =

Smartwatch

Samsung Gear S2 Samsung Gear S2 Classic
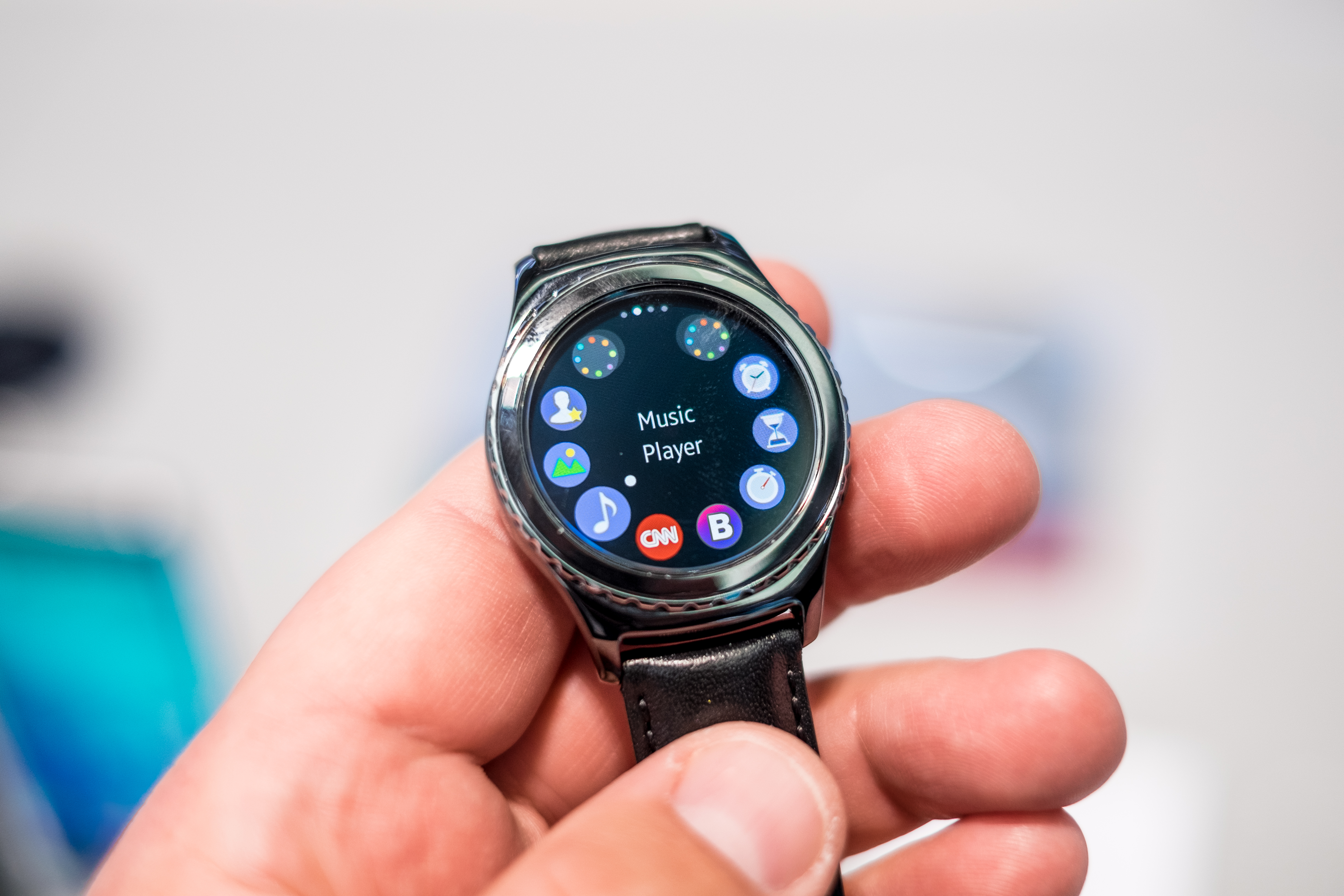
- Developer: Samsung
- Manufacturer: Samsung Electronics
- Product family: Samsung Gear
- Type: Smartwatch
- Released: October 2, 2015 (US)
- Operating system: Tizen
- CPU: Qualcomm Snapdragon 400 dual-core (3G version); Exynos dual-core (WiFi-only version)
- Memory: 512 MB
- Storage: 4 GB
- Display: 1.2" Super AMOLED, 360 x 360 pixels
- Input: Capacitive touch Pedometer (9-axis sensor); PPG heart rate monitor Dual microphones Ambient light sensor WiFi 802.11 b/g/n Bluetooth LE
- Power: 250 mAh, Qi inductive coil wireless charging
- Online services: Samsung Pay
- Dimensions: 49.8 x 42.3 x 11.4 mm (Gear S2 WiFi-only); 43.6 x 39.9 x 11.4 mm (Gear S2 Classic); 51.8 x 44 x 13.4 mm (2.04 x 1.73 x 0.53 in) (Gear S2 3G)
- Weight: 47g (Gear S2 WiFi-only); 42g (Gear S2 Classic); 51g (Gear S2 3G)
- Predecessor: Samsung Gear S
- Successor: Samsung Gear S3

The Samsung Gear S2 is a smartwatch developed by Samsung Electronics running Samsung's Tizen operating system. It was unveiled at IFA in 2015.

The Gear S2 was the first device to use eSIM technology. Its successor, the Samsung Gear S3, was released on November 18, 2016.

== Overview ==
The watch features a rotating bezel user interface and an IP68 rating for water resistance up to 1.5 meters deep in 30 minutes. It is compatible with 20mm width watch straps. It has a Super AMOLED display with a resolution of 360 x 360 pixels and a screen size of 1.2 inches. The watch has a dual-core Exynos processor running at 1 GHz. Samsung Pay can be used through NFC payment terminals.

== Comparison of models ==
Model	Gear S2 (WiFi-only)	Gear S2 Classic	Gear S2 (3G)
Display	1.2" circular Super AMOLED, 360 x 360 pixels, 302 dpi		
Dimensions	49.8 x 42.3 x 11.4 mm	43.6 x 39.9 x 11.4 mm	51.8 x 44 x 13.4 mm
Standalone cellular	No		Yes
Input	Capacitive touch Pedometer (9-axis sensor); PPG heart rate monitor Dual microphones Ambient light sensor WiFi 802.11 b/g/n Bluetooth LE; Speaker (3G variant only)		
Processor	Exynos 1 GHz dual-core ARM Cortex-A7		Qualcomm Snapdragon 400 1.2 GHz dual-core ARM Cortex-A7
Storage and RAM	4 GB internal storage, 512 MB RAM		
Band type	Fluoroelastomer	Leather	Fluoroelastomer
Battery	250 mAh 3.8v battery		300 mAh 3.8v battery
