= Samsung Gear 360 =

Samsung Gear 360 (2016)
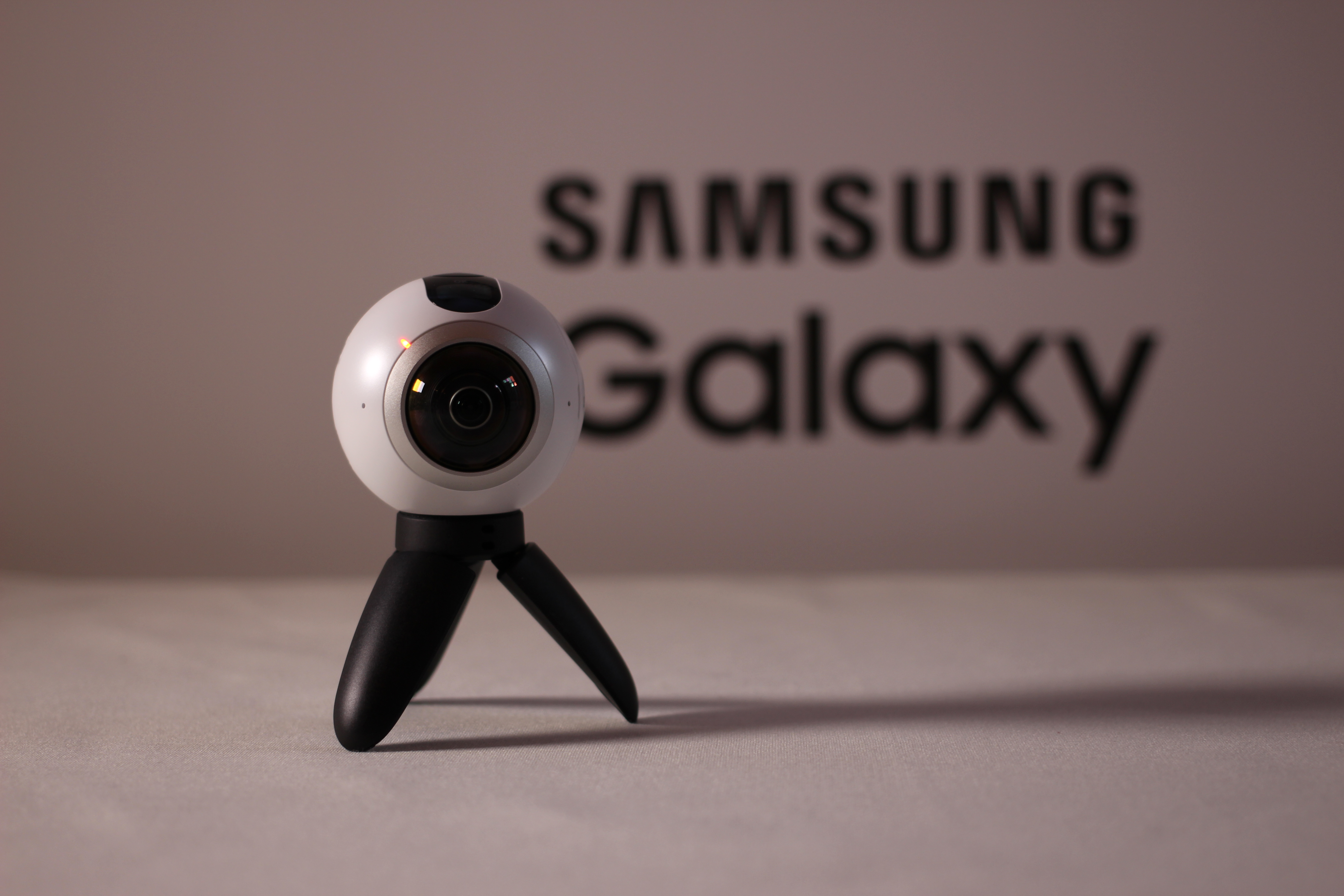
- Developer: Samsung Electronics
- Manufacturer: Samsung Electronics
- Product family: Gear
- Type: Camera
- Website: www.samsung.com/global/galaxy/gear-360

The Samsung Gear 360 is the first 360 degree camera by Samsung Electronics. It was released as a part of the Samsung Gear family of devices. It uses two cameras to take 360° photos and videos.

There are two models:

- The original model released in 2016, the SM-C200, a sphere.
- The updated model released in 2017, the SM-R210, a smaller sphere with integral handle.

== History ==
On April 29, 2016, Samsung released the Gear 360 in Korea and Singapore. It is compatible with the Samsung Galaxy S6 and later. Critics have praised the ease-of-use and small form factor.

In April 2017, an updated version of the Samsung Gear 360 was released. The design changed significantly and three features were upgraded: video resolution was boosted to 4K, live-streaming functionality was added, and it added image stabilization. It also works with iOS devices.

== Specifications ==
=== Hardware ===
Camera

- Dual CMOS 15 MP Sensor (Default Output pixel count equivalent to 25.9M)
  - Still resolution: 7776x3888 (2016); 5792x2896 (2017)
- Dual f/2.0 (2016) f/2.2 (2017) Fisheye Lens
- video up to 60 fps (2016); 120 fps (2017)

Memory

- 1 GB RAM
- MicroSD Card (up to 256 GB)

Battery

- 1350 mAh replaceable (2016)
- 1160 mAh integrated (2017)

Connectivity

- Wi-Fi 802.11 a/b/g/n/ac (2.4/5 GHz)
- Wi-Fi Direct
- Bluetooth® v4.1
- USB 2.0, NFC

Sensors

- Gyro
- Accelerometer

=== Software ===
The dedicated mobile application greatly extends available recording options and add the support for time lapse and looping video. The camera works with all phones that can run the required Samsung Gear 360 Manager app, such as the Samsung Galaxy S8, Galaxy S8+, Galaxy S7, Galaxy S7 Edge, Galaxy S6, S6 Edge, S6 Edge+, Note 5, A5 (2017) and A7 (2017).
