= Samsung Galaxy Gear =

Smartwatch by Samsung

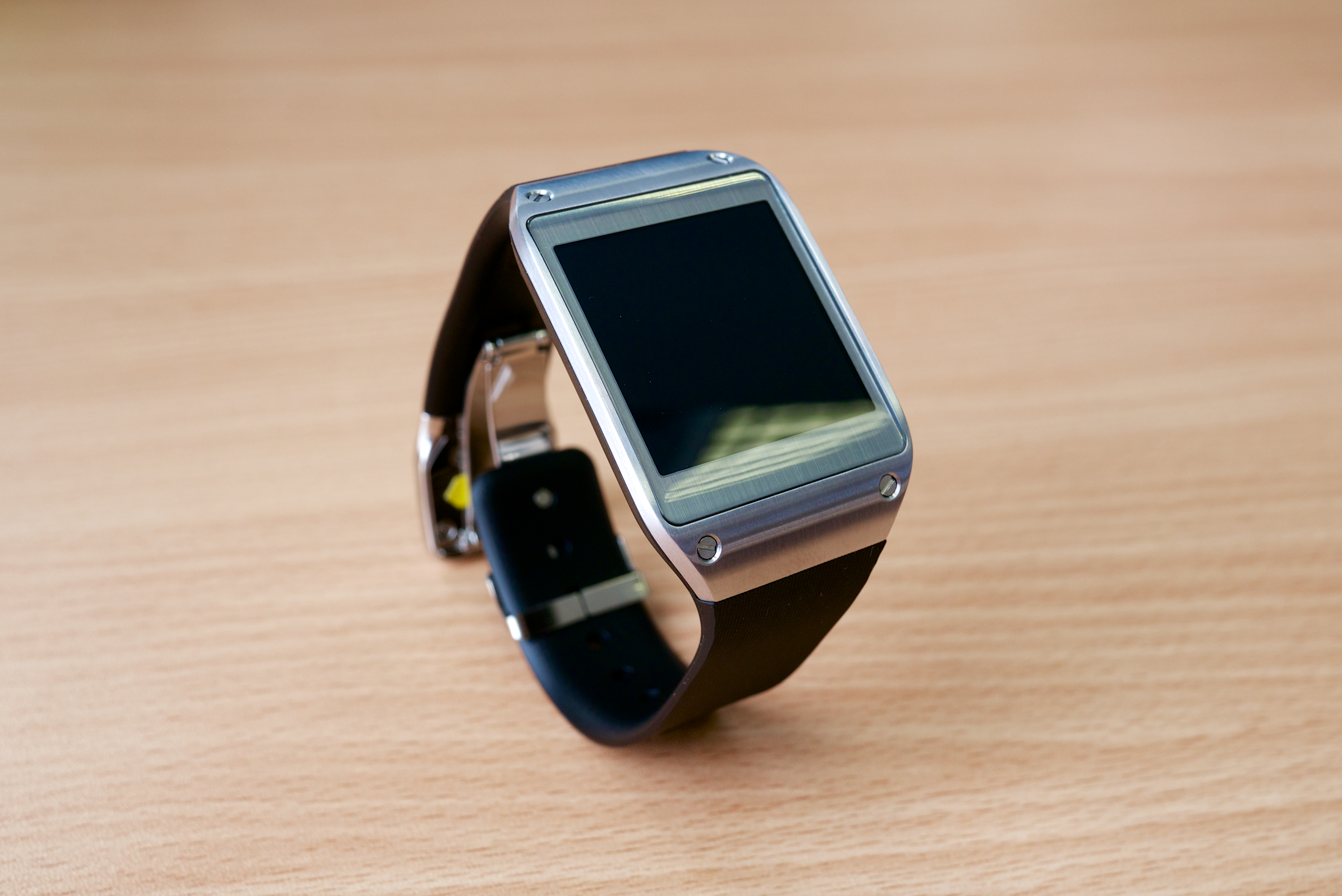
- Brand: Samsung
- Manufacturer: Samsung Electronics
- Type: Smartwatch
- Family: Samsung Galaxy; Samsung Gear
- First released: September 4, 2013; 13 years ago
- Availability by region: September 25, 2013; 13 years ago
- Discontinued: February 24, 2014; 12 years ago
- Successor: Samsung Gear 2
- Operating system: Original: Android 4.3 "Jelly Bean"; Current: Tizen
- System-on-chip: Exynos 4212
- CPU: Dual-core 1,600 MHz ARM
- Memory: 512 MB
- Storage: 4 GB
- Rear camera: 1.9 MP, BSI, 720p video recording
- Display: 1.6 in (41 mm) Super AMOLED with RGB matrix 320×320 pixels (1:1 aspect ratio) (275 ppi)
- Connectivity: Bluetooth Low Energy
- Website: samsung.com

The Samsung Galaxy Gear is a smartwatch manufactured and produced by Samsung Electronics in the Samsung Gear family of devices. Unveiled during a Samsung Unpacked event in Berlin, Germany on September 4, 2013 alongside the Galaxy Note 3, the device serves as a companion for all Samsung Galaxy smartphones and tablets which runs on Android 4.3 "Jelly Bean" or newer. It was released on September 25, 2013. Originally released as an Android-based device, Samsung replaced the operating system with Tizen through the May 2014 software update.

The Gear's successor, the Gear 2, was released on April 11, 2014.

== History ==
=== Development ===
The development of the Galaxy Gear came in the midst of a push towards the growing smartwatch market; Samsung's main competitor Apple had been the subject of rumors suggesting an upcoming watch product, while the Kickstarter-backed Pebble (which reached mass-market availability in July 2013) has been credited with creating mainstream interest in the concept. Lee Young-hee, vice president of Samsung's mobile business, revealed in July 2013 that the company had been working on a watch for a long time, and referred to it as a "product for the future". In August 2013, Bloomberg reported that "two people familiar with the matter" claimed Samsung would introduce a smartwatch, tentatively known as the 'Galaxy Gear', on September 4, 2013 during a Samsung Unpacked event prior to the IFA consumer electronics trade show in Berlin. Samsung was also expected to unveil the Galaxy Note 3 phablet during the event as well.

In an interview with The Korea Times published on August 27, 2013, Lee Young-hee stated that the Galaxy Gear would "enhance and enrich the current smart mobile experience in many ways", would "lead a new trend in smart mobile communications", and "add meaningful momentum to the mobile industry.

=== Release ===
Samsung officially unveiled the Galaxy Gear on September 4, 2013, with a release date set for September 25, 2013 (although its release in the United States and Japan would be delayed into October). Some wireless service providers, as an incentive, have also offered the Galaxy Gear as part of a bundle with the Galaxy Note 3.

To promote the Galaxy Gear, Samsung released two television advertisements, "Evolution" and "A Long Time Coming". Both ads showcased historical depictions of smartwatch-like devices in popular culture (including those seen in Dick Tracy, Star Trek, The Jetsons, Predator, and Inspector Gadget), with the tagline "After all these years, it's finally real."

Samsung Galaxy Gear's watch design was exclusively leaked to VentureBeat reporter Christina Farr by an unnamed source several days prior to its Berlin release on September 4, 2013, generating widespread global interest.

== Specifications ==
=== Hardware ===
The Galaxy Gear is powered by a dual-core, 1,600 MHz Exynos 4212 system-on-chip, that was scaled back to one CPU core, 800 MHz to help save battery life, and contains a 320-pixel-wide square-shaped Super AMOLED touchscreen display with a pixel density of 277 ppi. Its band contains a 1.9-megapixel camera with a back-illuminated sensor, auto-focus, and 720p video recording, along with a speaker and two noise-cancelling microphones. The Galaxy Gear also includes 4 GB of internal memory, 512 MB of RAM, an accelerometer, and a gyroscope. The device contains a 315 mAh battery; the device itself does not contain a charging port and must be placed inside a special Micro USB-equipped charging case, which also contains an NFC tag that is used for the initial setup of the device. The Galaxy Gear is designed to IP55 specifications with dust resistance and protection from short-term exposure to water jets.

To communicate with a host device, the Galaxy Gear uses Bluetooth Low Energy. As only Android 4.3 and later offer native support for Bluetooth LE, only the Galaxy Note 3 and Galaxy Note 10.1 2014 Edition, the first Samsung devices to ship with 4.3, were supported by the Galaxy Gear on launch. Shortly after the release of the Galaxy Gear, Samsung began rolling out Android 4.3 updates for its other recent devices, such as the Galaxy S III, S4 and Note II, to ensure Galaxy Gear compatibility.

=== Software ===
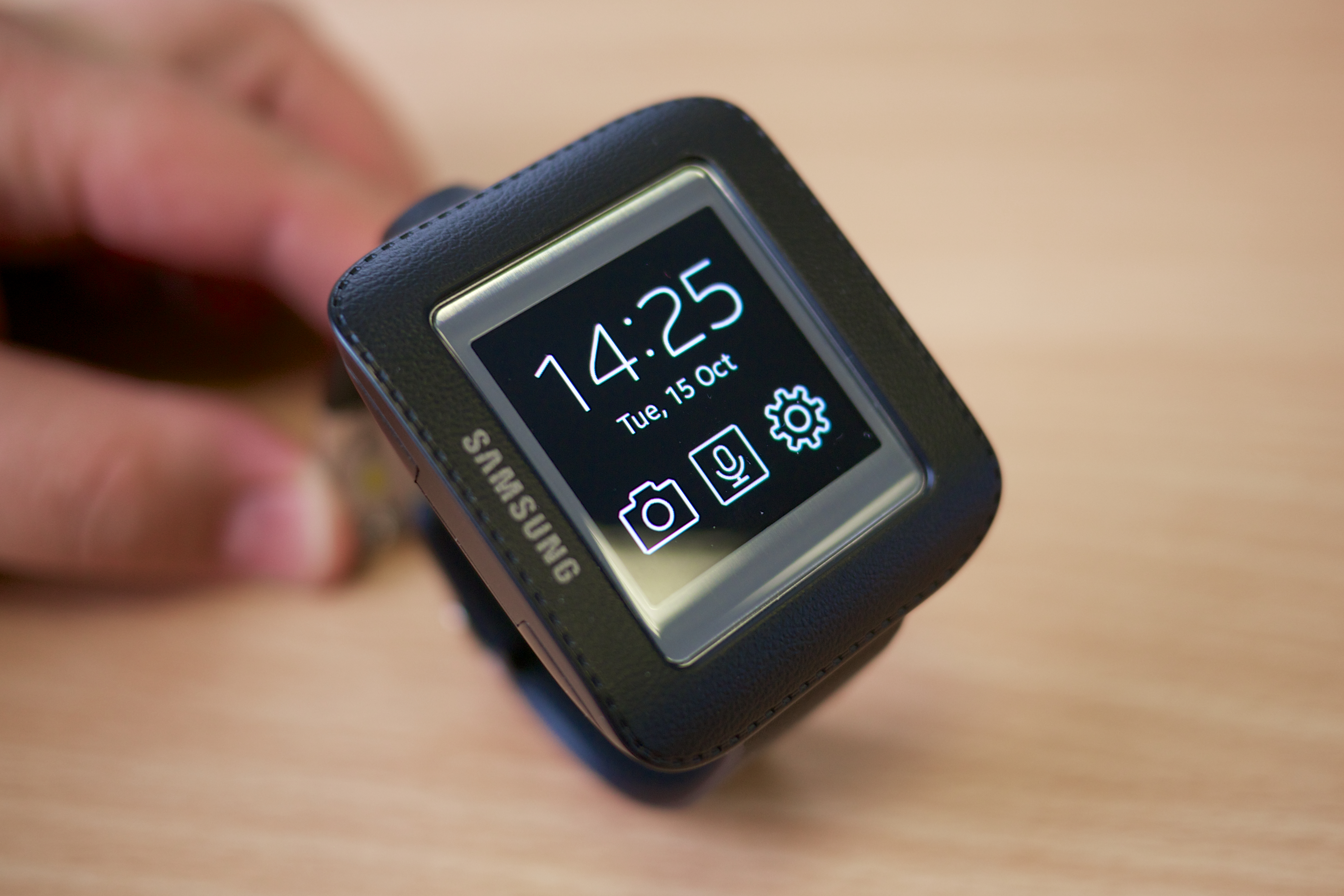
A Galaxy Gear in its USB charging cradle, displaying a digital clock

The Galaxy Gear uses an Android or Tizen-based operating system with a minimalistic interface and gesture-based navigation. To pair the watch with a smartphone or tablet as its host device, the user must first install the Gear Manager app. An NFC tag located inside the charging case is used to download the app. Gear Manager uses Bluetooth to coordinate the pairing process and further communication with the device. It can also be used to configure the device's settings (such as the clock display's color and appearance), and to manage and install apps via Samsung Apps.

Notifications can be synced from the host device and displayed on the Gear's screen when received; a preview of a notification's content is displayed on the watch itself, while the Smart Relay feature allows users to open content displayed on Gear on their smartphone or tablet. S Voice can be used for basic voice commands and voice dictation for certain apps. Phone calls can also be answered and placed from the watch (the dialer is launched by swiping up on the clock display), while the "Find My Device" tool can be used to locate the watch with a phone or tablet, or vice versa.

The camera app can take photos, or record videos up to 15 seconds in length. Photos and videos can be stored to the device's internal storage, or immediately transferred to the user's phone or tablet. Users can also record up to 5 minutes' worth of voice memos. A media controller for music or video being played by the phone or tablet is also provided.

While it is possible to sideload other Android apps on the device over Android Debug Bridge (ADB), their usability is impaired by the small screen, and an inability to access the Internet directly.

On May 30, 2014, Samsung released the version 2.2 firmware update for the Galaxy Gear through its Kies desktop software. The update replaces the Android-based operating system of the device with the Tizen-based operating system of its successor, the Samsung Gear 2. The new software, among other improvements, provides improved performance and battery life, a voice-controlled camera, and a standalone music player that can play tracks stored in the device's internal storage.

== Reception ==
The Galaxy Gear received generally negative comments from critics. The design of the Gear itself was met with mixed reactions; although considered high quality, the incorporation of components directly into its strap was criticized for making it inflexible (and thus making the device hard to wear comfortably). The Gear was also criticized for the limited functionality of its apps, along with its initially inconsistent notification system. As an example, critics pointed out that the Android IMAP/POP3 email client was able to display full notifications with message previews on the Galaxy Gear, while Gmail was only able to display an icon and directed users to open the message on their phone instead. These limitations surrounding notifications were addressed in the Galaxy Gear's first firmware update, which allows all apps to display notifications with previews on the Galaxy Gear.

On the topic, The Verge remarked that "as with industrial design, software engineering isn't among Samsung's strengths, and the results on the Gear are a painful mix of unreliability and inadequacy." The ability to answer phone calls on the device was praised for its convenience and good call quality (drawing comparisons to Dick Tracy), while its camera was also praised for having unexpectedly decent quality for its megapixel size. The device's reliance on Samsung Galaxy devices with specific versions of Android was also criticized, along with its poor battery life, which was considered more comparable to a smartphone than a watch.

In an infographic posted in September 2013, TUAW compared the Galaxy Gear to the sixth-generation iPod Nano (which attracted unofficial watchband accessories due to its similarly square form factor) considering the three-year-old MP3 player to be a "better, cheaper [smart]watch" than the Galaxy Gear because it is not dependent on a "host" smartphone or tablet, and contained a larger number of features than the Galaxy Gear (including the ability to, primarily, store and play music from the device itself).

=== Sales ===
The Galaxy Gear performed poorly in terms of commercial sales; in late October 2013, it was reported that at least 30% of the Galaxy Gear watches sold by the U.S.-based chain Best Buy were being returned by unsatisfied customers. In November 2013, Reuters reported that company sources claimed that 800,000 Galaxy Gears were sold worldwide; however, the Korean news agency Yonhap disputed the report, believing that the numbers actually referred to units shipped and not units sold.
