= Smartwatch =

Wearable computer in the form of a watch

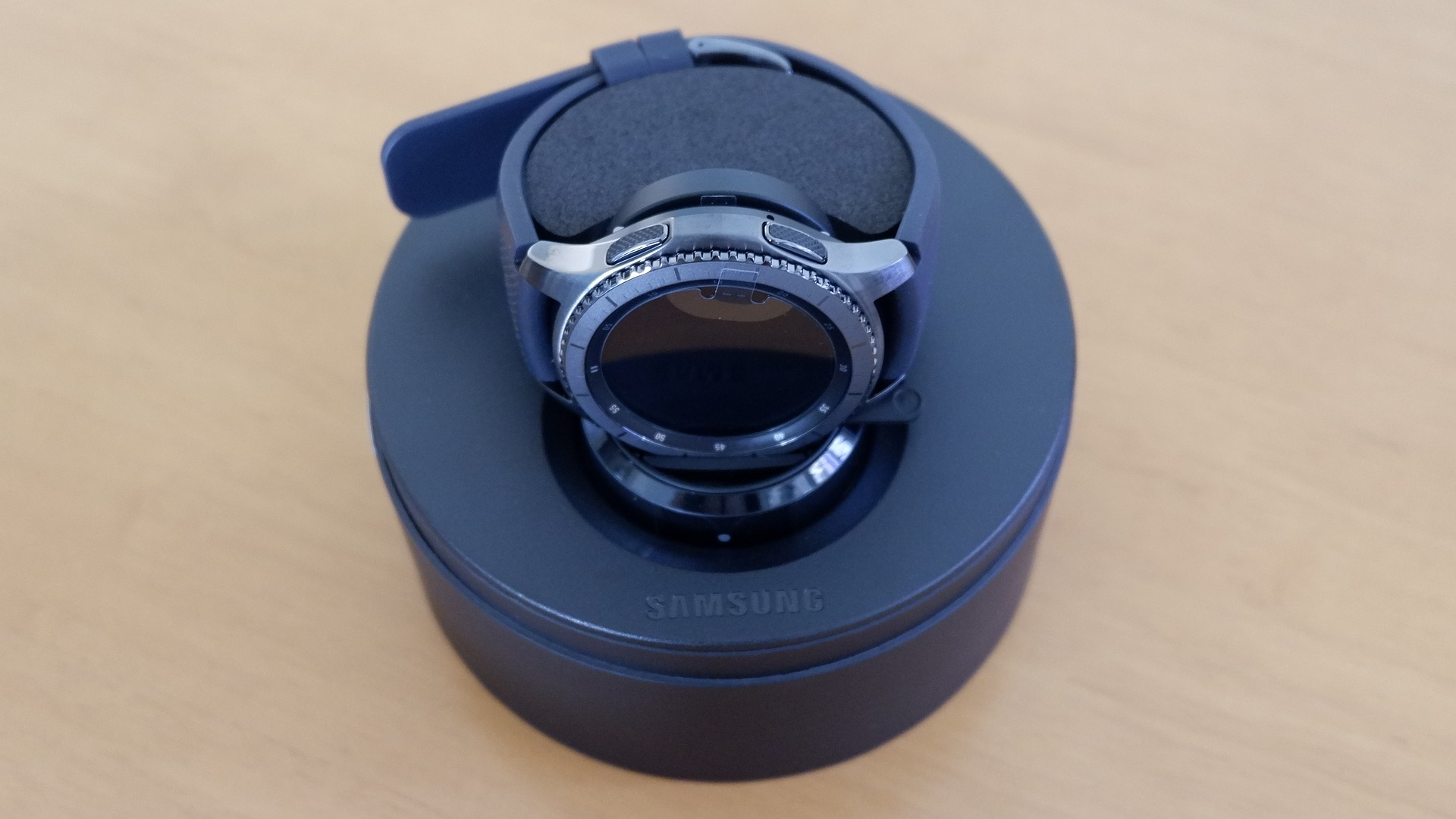
A Samsung Galaxy Watch

A smartwatch is a wearable computer that resembles a wristwatch. Most modern smartwatches are operated via a touchscreen, and rely on mobile apps that run on a connected device (such as a smartphone) in order to provide core functions.

Early smartwatches were capable of performing basic functions like calculating, displaying digital time, translating text, and playing games. More recent models often offer features comparable to smartphones, including apps, a mobile operating system, Bluetooth and Wi-Fi connectivity, and the ability to function as portable media players or FM radios. Most high-end models have cellular capabilities, allowing users to make and receive phone calls.

While internal hardware varies, most smartwatches have a backlit liquid-crystal display (LCD) or OLED display and are powered by a rechargeable lithium-ion battery. They may also incorporate GPS receivers, digital cameras, and microSD card readers, as well as various internal and environmental sensors such as thermometers, accelerometers, altimeters, barometers, gyroscopes, and ambient light sensors. Some smartwatches also function as activity trackers and include body sensors such as pedometers, heart rate monitors, galvanic skin response sensors, and ECG sensors. Software may include maps, health and exercise-related apps, calendars, and various watch faces.

== History ==
=== Early years ===
The first digital watch was the Pulsar, introduced by the Hamilton Watch Company in 1972. The "Pulsar" became a brand name, and would later be acquired by Seiko in 1978. In 1982, a Pulsar watch (NL C01) was released which could store 24 digits, likely making it the first watch with user-programmable memory, or the first "memorybank" watch.

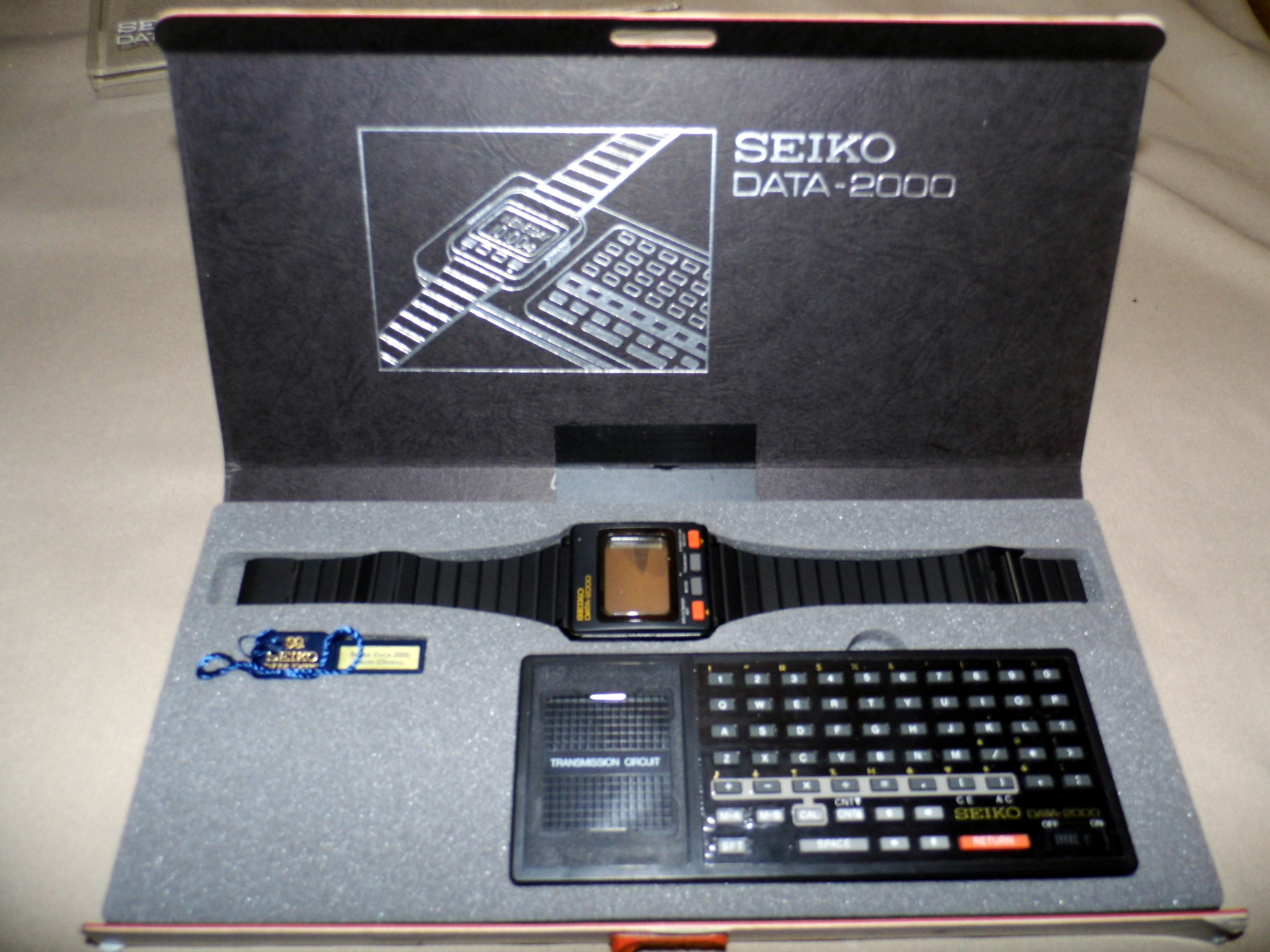
Seiko Data-2000 with docking station, 1984

With the introduction of personal computers in the 1980s, Seiko began to develop computers in the form of watches. The Data 2000 watch, named for its ability to store 2000 characters, came with an external keyboard for data entry. Data was synchronised from the keyboard to the watch via electromagnetic coupling (wireless docking). Its memory was small, at only 112 digits. It was released in 1984, in gold, silver, and black.

These models were followed by many others from Seiko during the 1980s, most notably the "RC Series". The RC-1000 Wrist Terminal from Seiko Epson was released in 1984; it was the first Seiko model to interface with a computer and was priced at around £100. It featured 2 KB of storage, a two-line, 12-character display, and data transfer with a computer via an RS232C interface. It was powered by a computer on a chip, and was compatible with most of the popular PCs of that time, including Apple II, II+ and IIe, BBC Micro, Commodore 64, IBM PC, NEC 8201, Tandy Color Computer, Model 1000, 1200, 2000 and TRS-80 Model I, III, 4 and 4p. The RC-20 Wrist Computer was released in 1985, followed by the RC-4000 and RC-4500.

During the 1980s, Casio began to market a successful line of "computer watches" in addition to its calculator watches, most notably the Casio data bank series. Casio and other companies also produced novelty "game watches", such as the Nelsonic game watches.

Although pager watches were predicted in the early 1980s, it took until the end of the decade for them to become more common. Two models were particularly notable: Motorola and Timex produced the Wrist Watch Pager, while AT&T Corporation and Seiko produced the MessageWatch.

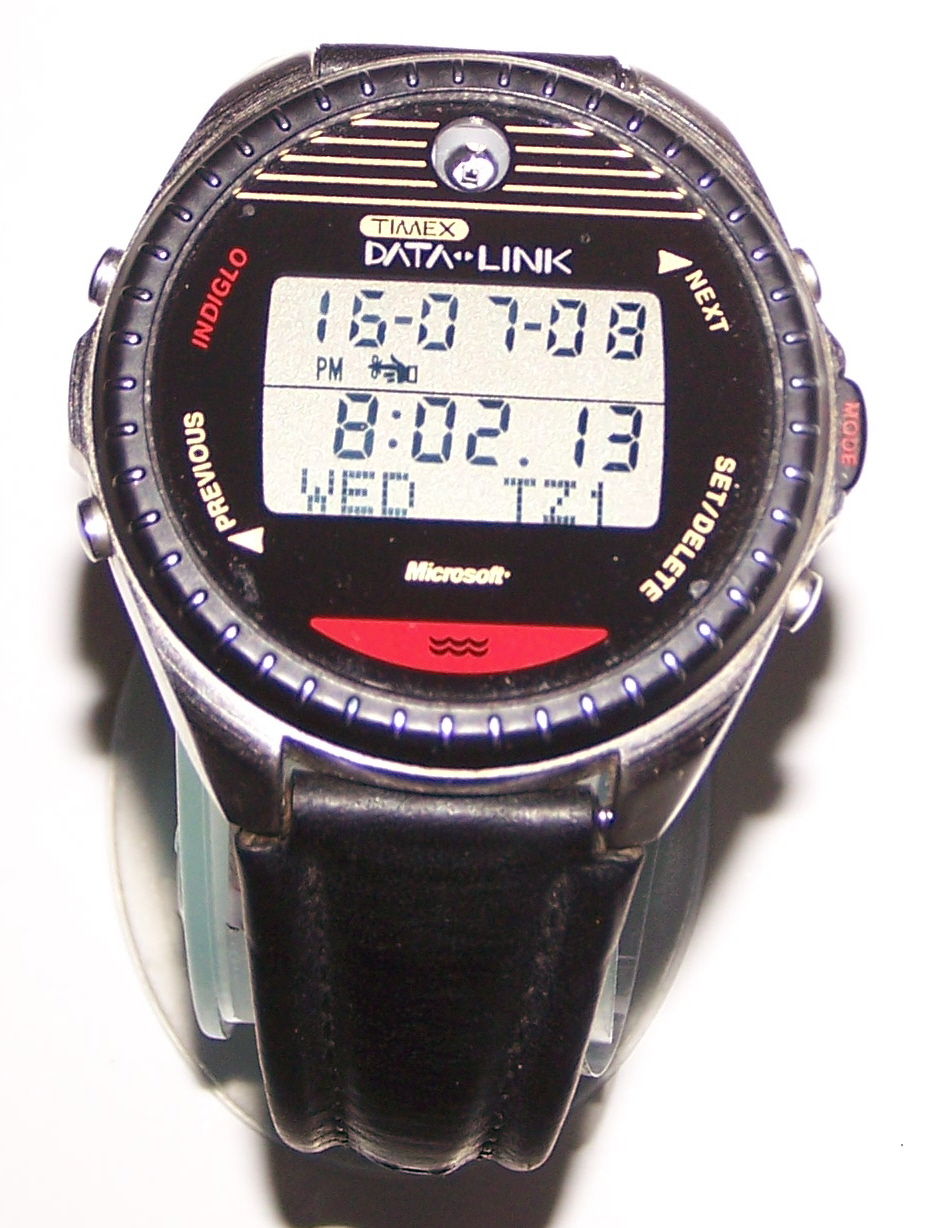
Timex Datalink Model 150 as worn by commander William Shepherd during Expedition 1 and cosmonaut Mikhail Tyurin, Expedition 14, on the International Space Station in 2006

=== 1990s ===
The Timex Datalink, introduced in 1994, was the first watch capable of transferring data wirelessly from a computer. Appointments and contacts created with Microsoft Schedule Plus (the predecessor to MS Outlook) could be downloaded to the watch via patterns of visible light, which were displayed by a computer monitor and then detected by the watch's optical sensor.

In 1998, Steve Mann designed and built the world's first Linux wristwatch. He presented it at the IEEE ISSCC on 7 February 2000, where he was dubbed "the father of wearable computing". The watch later appeared on the cover of Linux Journal in July 2000, in which it was the topic of a featured article.

Seiko launched the Ruputer in 1998 in Japan, a wristwatch computer with a 3.6 MHz processor. The Ruputer failed to achieve wide success due to its small, hard-to-read screen, cumbersome joystick method of navigation and text input, and poor battery life. Outside of Japan, this watch was distributed as the Matsucom onHand PC. Despite low demand, it was distributed until 2006, making it a smartwatch with a long life cycle. Ruputer and onHand PC applications are fully compatible with each other. This watch is sometimes considered the first smartwatch, as it was the first to display graphics (albeit in monochrome), and third-party applications (mostly homebrew).

In 1999, Samsung launched the world's first watch phone, the SPH-WP10. It had a protruding antenna, monochrome LCD screen, and 90-minute talk time with an integrated speaker and microphone.

=== 2000s ===
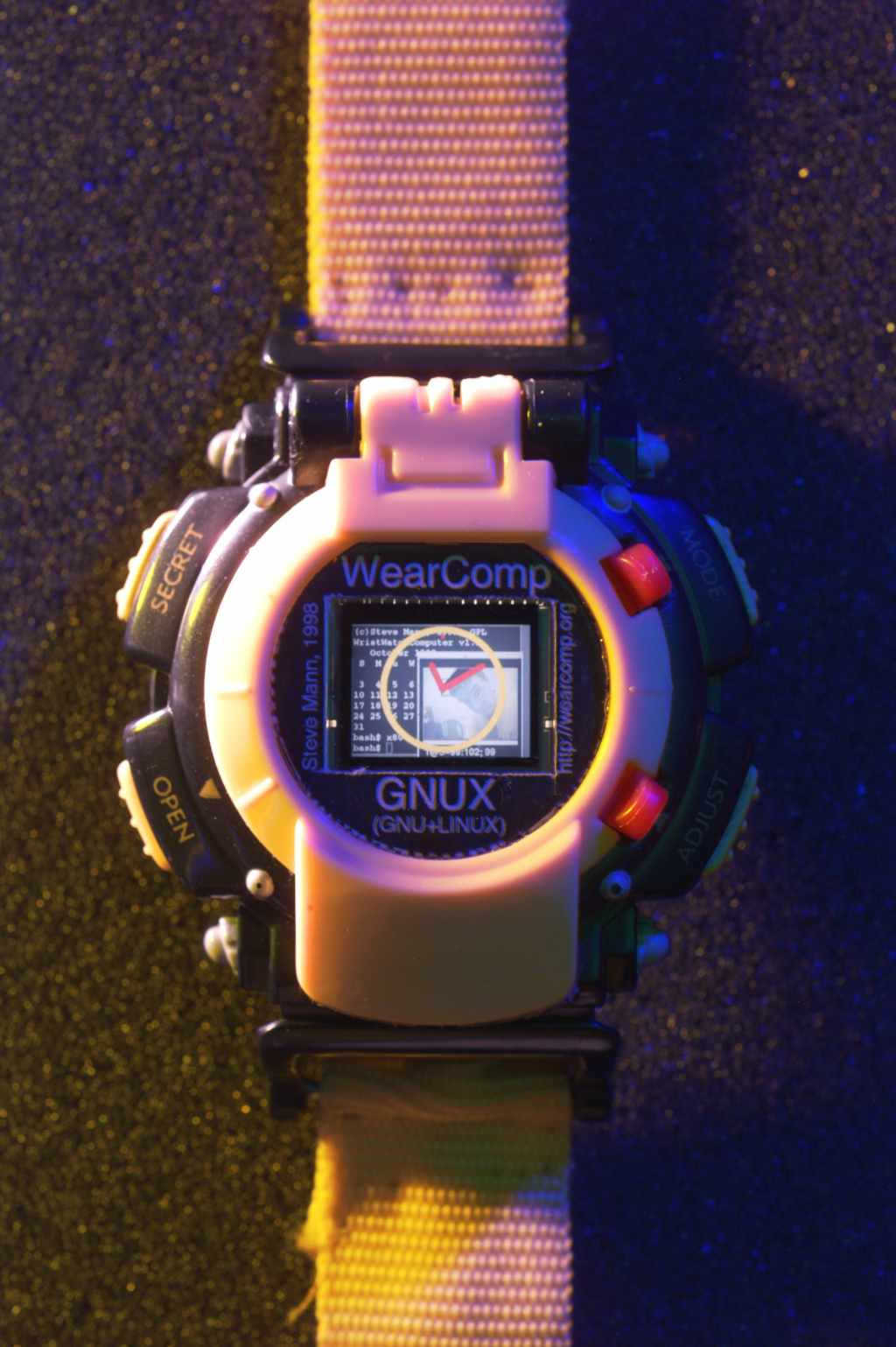
The first Linux Smartwatch was presented at IEEE ISSCC2000 on 7 February 2000, where presenter Steve Mann was dubbed "the father of wearable computing". This watch also appeared on the cover and was the feature article of Linux Journal Issue 75.

In June 2000, IBM displayed a prototype for the WatchPad, a wristwatch that ran Linux. The original version had only 6 hours of battery life, which was later extended to 12. It featured 8 MB of memory and ran Linux 2.2. The device was later upgraded with an accelerometer, vibrating mechanism, and fingerprint sensor. IBM began to collaborate with Citizen Watch Co. to create the "WatchPad". The WatchPad 1.5 features a 320 × 240 QVGA monochrome touch sensitive display and runs Linux 2.4. It also features calendar software, Bluetooth, 8 MB of RAM and 16 MB of flash memory. Citizen was hoping to market the watch to students and businessmen, with a retail price of around $399. Epson Seiko introduced their Chrono-bit wristwatch in September 2000. The Chrono-bit watches have a rotating bezel for data input, synchronize PIM data via a serial cable, and can load custom watch faces.

In 2003, Fossil released the Wrist PDA, a watch that ran the Palm OS and contained 8 MB of RAM and 4 MB of flash memory. It contained a built in stylus to assist in using the tiny monochrome display, which had a resolution of 160×160 pixels. Although many reviewers declared the watch revolutionary, it was criticized for its weight (108 grams) and was discontinued in 2005.

In the same year, Microsoft announced its SPOT smartwatch, which it released in early 2004. SPOT stands for Smart Personal Objects Technology, an initiative by Microsoft to personalize household electronics and other everyday gadgets. For instance, the company demonstrated coffee makers, weather stations, and alarm clocks featuring built-in SPOT technology. The device was a standalone smartwatch that offered information at a glance, in comparison to other devices that required more immersion and interaction. The information included weather, news, stock prices, and sports scores, and was transmitted through FM waves. It was accessible through a yearly subscription that cost between $39 and $59.

The Microsoft SPOT Watch had a monochrome 90×126 pixel screen. Fossil, Suunto, and Tissot also sold smartwatches using SPOT technology. For instance, Fossil's Abacus, which was a variant of the Fossil Wrist PDA, retailed from $130 to $150.

Sony Ericsson teamed up with Fossil and released the first watch, MBW-100, that connected to Bluetooth. This watch notified the user when receiving calls and text messages. The watch struggled to gain popularity, however, due to its exclusivity to Sony Ericsson phones.

In 2009, Hermen van den Burg, CEO of Smartwatch and Burg Wearables, launched Burg, the first smartphone watch with its own SIM card. The watch was "standalone", meaning it did not require tethering to a smartphone. Burg received the award for the Most Innovative Product at the Canton Fair in April 2009. Samsung also launched their S9110 Watch Phone, which featured a 1.76-inch (45 mm) color LCD and was 11.98 millimetres (0.472 in) thick.

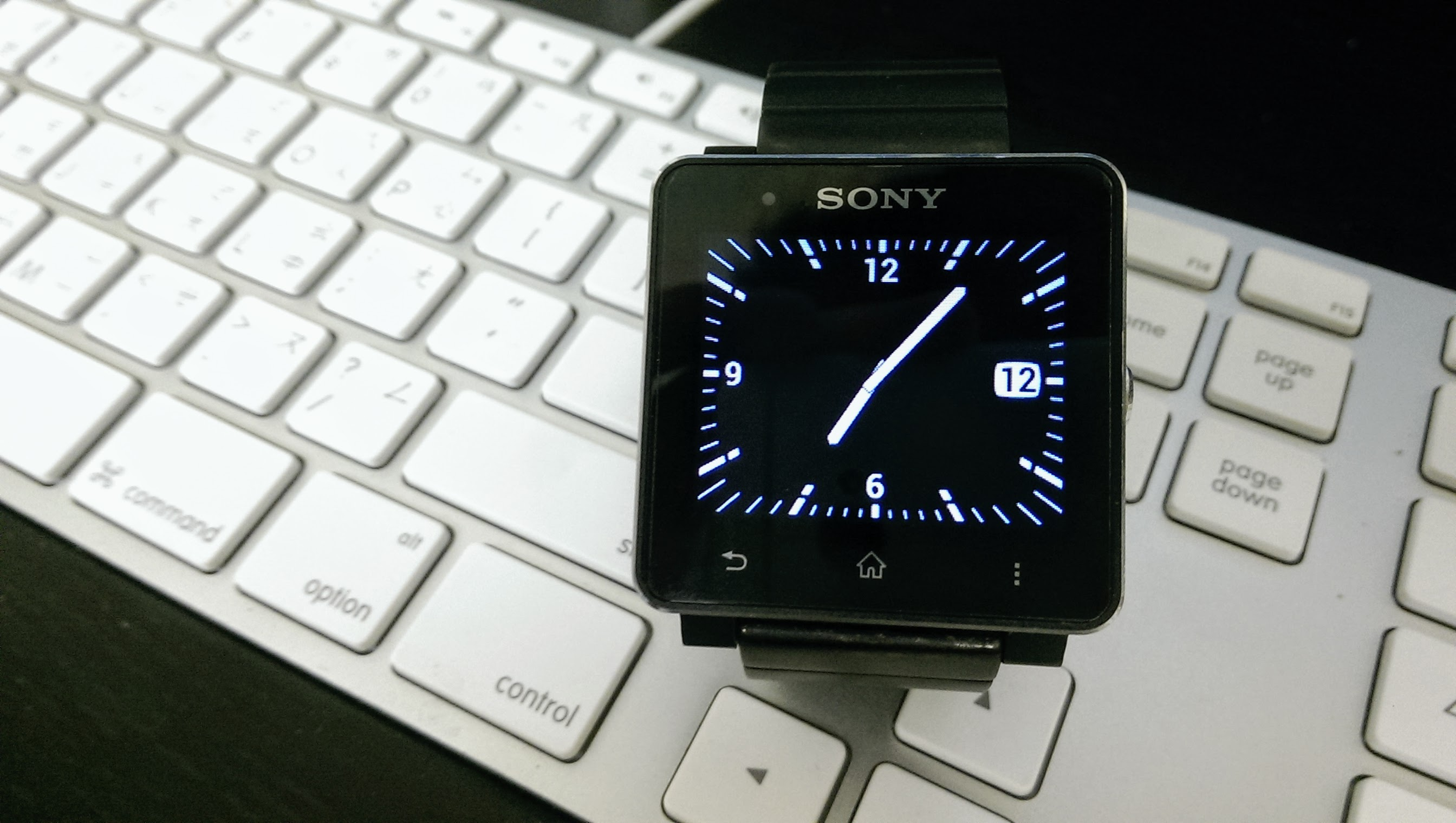
Watch face display of a Sony Smartwatch 2

=== 2010s ===
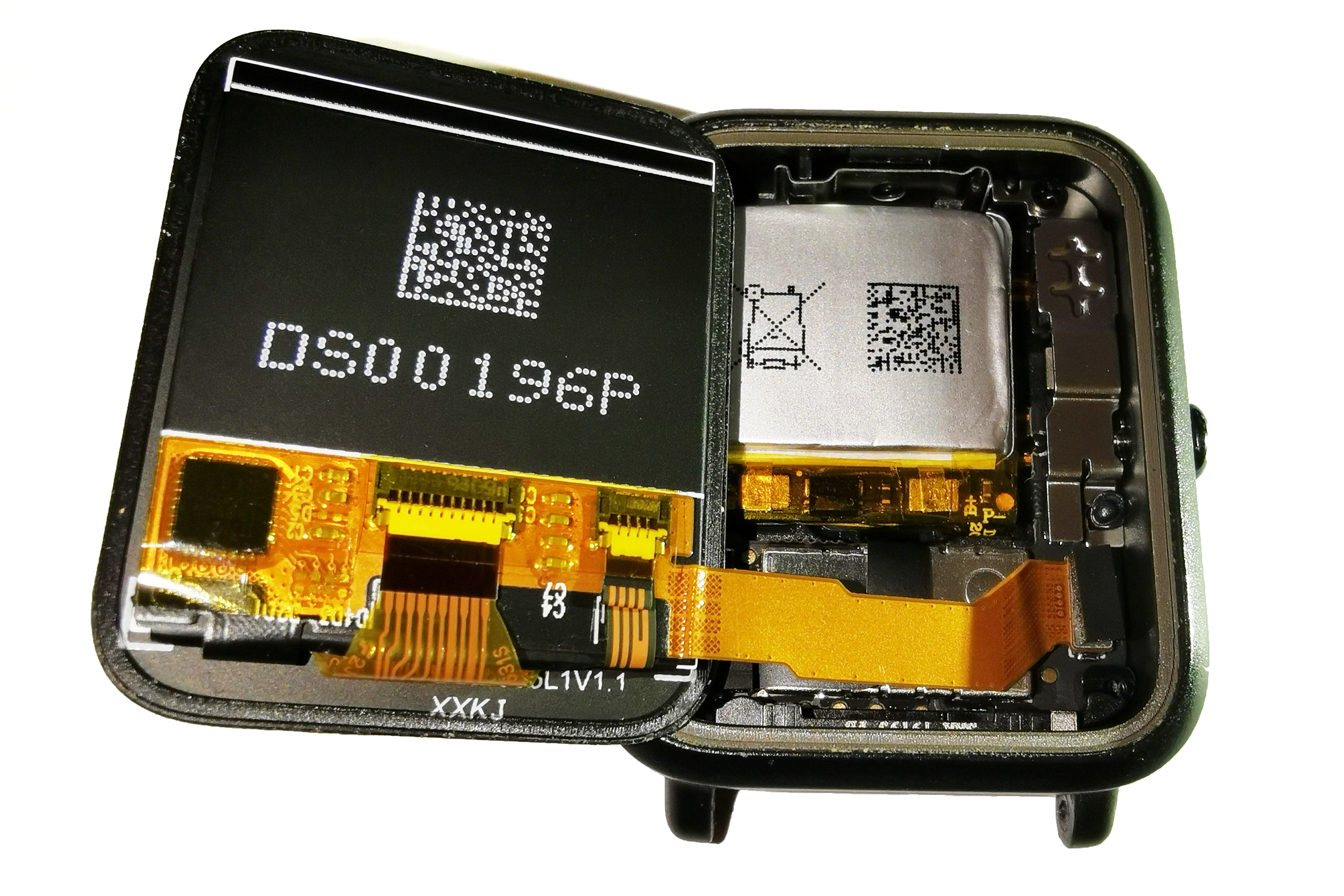
Inside Amazfit Bip

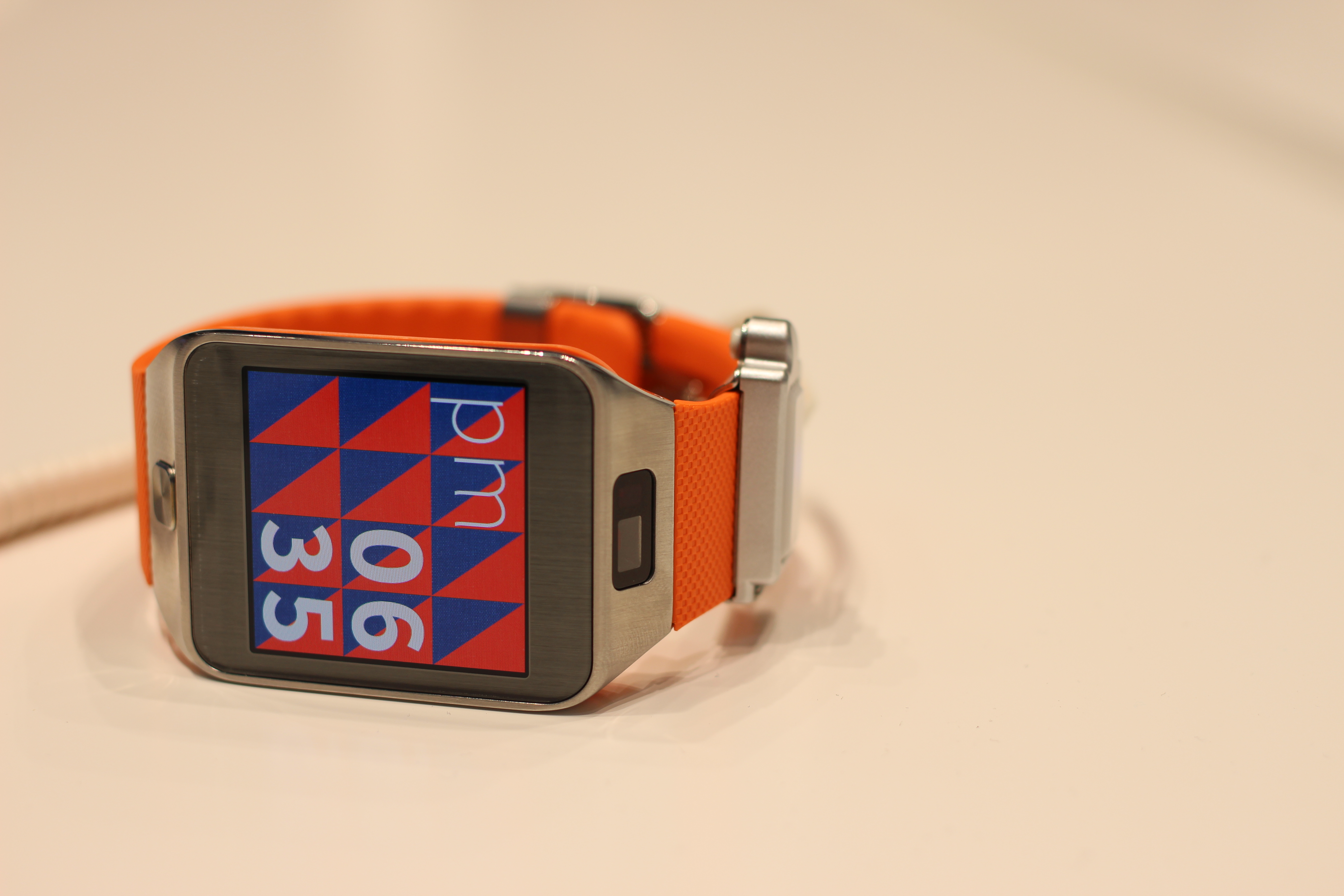
Samsung Gear 2 smartwatch with integrated photo and video camera

Sony Ericsson launched the Sony Ericsson LiveView, a wearable watch device which was essentially an external Bluetooth display for an Android smartphone.

Vyzin Electronics Private Limited launched a ZigBee enabled smart watch called VESAG, which featured cellular connectivity for remote health monitoring.

Motorola released MOTOACTV on 6 November 2011.

Pebble is a smartwatch that was funded via Kickstarter, which set a fundraising record for the site, raising $10.3 million between 12 April and 18 May 2012. The watch has a 32-millimetre (1.26 in) 144 × 168 pixel black and white memory LCD, using an ultra low-power "transflective LCD" manufactured by Sharp. It features a backlight, vibrating motor, magnetometer, ambient light sensors, and three-axis accelerometer. It can communicate with an Android or iOS device using both Bluetooth 2.1 and Bluetooth 4.0 (Bluetooth Low Energy) via Stonestreet One's Bluetopia+MFi software stack. Bluetooth 4.0 support was not initially enabled, but a firmware update in November 2013 enabled it. The watch is charged using a modified USB-cable that attaches magnetically to the watch, allowing it to maintain water resistance. The battery was reported in April 2012 to last seven days. Based on feedback from Kickstarter backers, the developers added water resistance to the device's feature set. The Pebble has a waterproof rating of 5 atm, which means it can be submerged down to 40 metres (130 ft) and has been tested in both fresh and salt water, allowing one to shower, dive or swim while wearing the watch.

In 2013, startup Omate announced its TrueSmart watch via a Kickstarter campaign, claiming it was the first smartwatch to capture the full capabilities of a smartphone. The campaign raised over $1 million, making it the 5th most successful Kickstarter at that time. The device made its public debut in early 2014. Consumer device analyst Avi Greengart, from research firm Current Analysis, suggested that 2013 may be the "year of the smartwatch", as "the components have gotten small enough and cheap enough" and many consumers own smartphones that are compatible with a wearable device. Wearable technology, such as Google Glass, was speculated to evolve into a business worth US$6 billion annually, and a July 2013 media report revealed that the majority of major consumer electronics manufacturers were undertaking work on a smartwatch device at the time of publication. The retail price of a smartwatch could be over US$300, plus data charges, while the minimum cost of smartphone-linked devices may be US$100.

As of July 2013, the list of companies that were engaged in smartwatch development activities consisted of Acer, Apple, BlackBerry, Foxconn/Hon Hai, Google, LG, Microsoft, Qualcomm, Samsung, Sony, VESAG and Toshiba. Some notable omissions from this list include HP, HTC, Lenovo, and Nokia. Science and technology journalist Christopher Mims identified the following points in relation to the future of smartwatches:

- Insufficient battery life is an ongoing problem for smartwatch developers, as the battery life of devices at the time of publication was three to four days, and this is likely to be reduced if further functions are added.
- New display technologies will be invented as a result of smartwatch research.
- The market success of smartwatches is unpredictable, as they may follow a similar trajectory to netbooks, or they may fulfil aims akin to those of Google Glass, another wearable electronic product.

Acer's S.T. Liew stated in an interview with gadget website Pocket-Lint that he believed that companies should be researching wearable technology, and that it could grown to "billions of dollars' worth of industry".

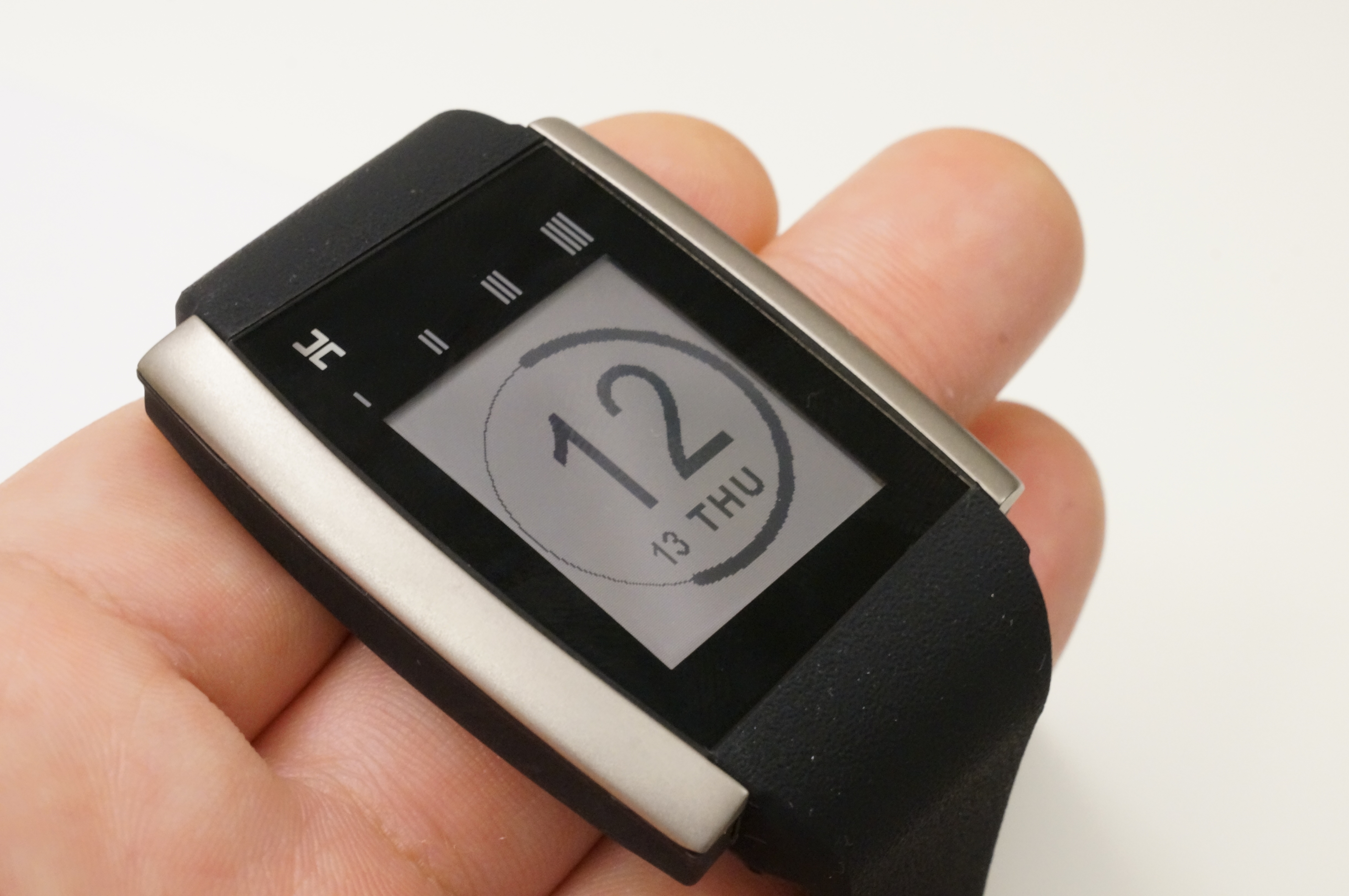
HOT Watch by PHTL features a speaker and microphone on the strap, allowing for calls to be answered on the watch.

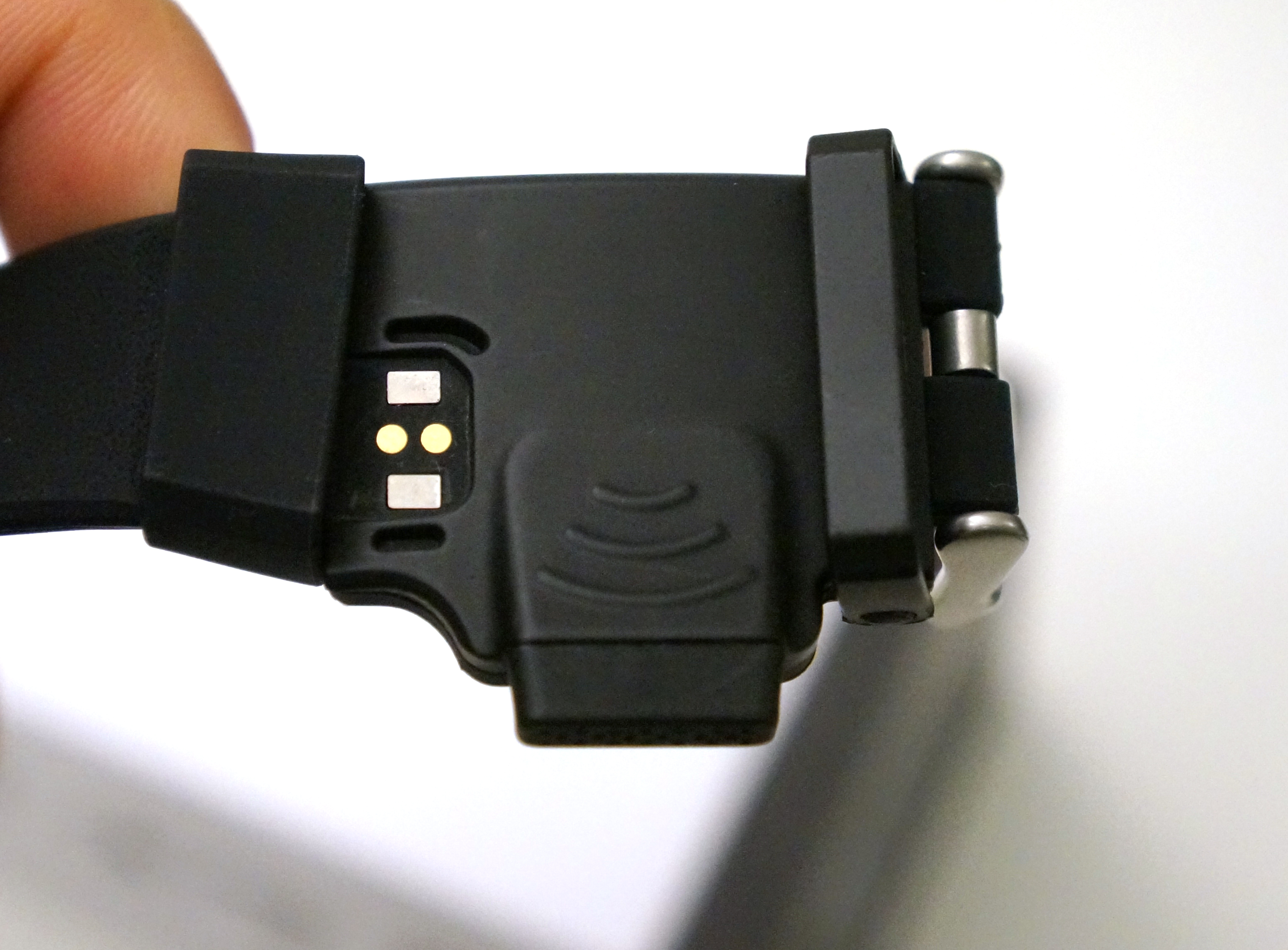
HOT Watch speaker and microphone embedded on the strap. Magnetic charging pins at left.

As of 4 September 2013, three new smartwatches had been launched: the Samsung Galaxy Gear, Sony SmartWatch 2, and the Qualcomm Toq. PHTL, a company based in Dallas, Texas, completed a Kickstarter campaign for its HOT Watch smartwatch in September 2013. This device enables users to leave their handsets in their pockets, since it has a speaker for phone calls in both quiet and noisy environments. In a September 2013 interview, Pebble founder Eric Migicovsky stated that his company was not interested in any acquisition offers. Two months later, he revealed that his company has sold 190,000 smartwatches, most of which were sold after its Kickstarter campaign closed.

Motorola Mobility CEO Dennis Woodside confirmed during a December 2013 interview that his company was working on a smartwatch. Woodside further discussed the difficulties that other companies had experienced with wrist-wearable technologies.

In April 2014, the Samsung Gear 2 was released, one of few smartwatches to be equipped with a digital camera. It has a resolution of two megapixels and can record video in 720p.

At the 2014 Consumer Electronics Show, a large number of new smartwatches were released from various companies such as Razer Inc. Archos, Some called the show a "wrist revolution". At Google I/O on 25 June 2014, the Android Wear platform was introduced and the LG G Watch and Samsung Gear Live were released. The Wear-based Moto 360 was announced by Motorola in 2014. At the end of July, Swatch's CEO Nick Hayek announced that they will launch a Swatch Touch with smartwatch technologies in 2015. In the UK, London's Wearable Technology Show debuted several new models from smartwatch companies.

Samsung's Gear S smartwatch was launched in late August 2014. The model features a curved Super AMOLED display and a built-in 3G modem. TechCrunch's Darrell Etherington said that "we're finally starting to see displays that wrap around the contours of the wrist, rather than sticking out as a traditional flat surface". The corporation commenced selling the Gear S smartwatch in October 2014, alongside the Gear Circle headset accessory. At IFA 2014, Sony Mobile announced the third generation of its smartwatch series, the Sony Smartwatch 3, powered by Android Wear. Fashion Entertainments' e-paper watch was also announced at the show.

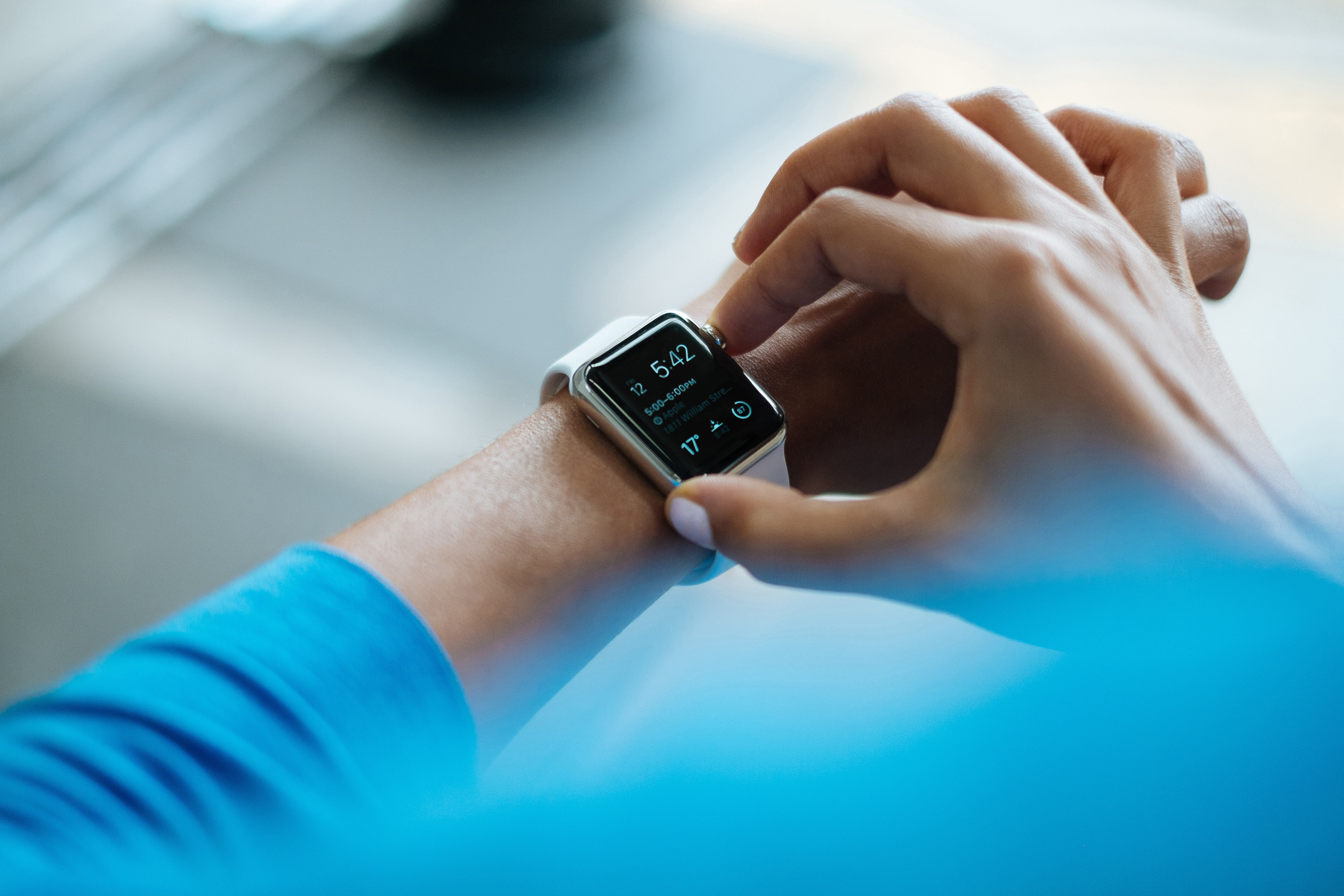
A person wearing a contemporary smartwatch (Apple Watch)

On 9 September 2014, Apple Inc. announced its first smartwatch, called Apple Watch, with an early 2015 release date. On 24 April 2015, Apple Watch began shipping worldwide. Apple's first wearable attempt was met with considerable criticism during its pre-launch period, with many early technology reviews citing issues with battery life and hardware malfunctions. However, other outlets praised Apple for creating a device with the potential to compete with "traditional watches" instead of just smartwatches. The watch's screen only wakes when activated by lifting one's wrist, touching the screen, or pressing a button. On 29 October 2014, Microsoft announced the Microsoft Band, a smart fitness tracker and the company's first venture into wrist-worn devices since SPOT (Smart Personal Objects Technology) a decade earlier. The Microsoft Band was released at $199 the following day.

In October 2015, Samsung unveiled the Samsung Gear S2. It features a rotating bezel for ease of use, and an IP68 rating for water resistance up to 1.5 meters deep for 30 minutes. The watch is compatible with industry-standard 20 mm straps.

At the 2016 Consumer Electronics Show, Razer released the Nabu Watch, a dual-screen smartwatch. The first screen integrates an always-on illuminated backlit display and handles standard features such as date and time. The second OLED screen, activated by raising one's wrist, allows access to additional smart features. Luxury watchmaker TAG Heuer also released TAG Heuer Connected, a smartwatch powered by Android Wear.

On 31 August 2016, Samsung unveiled the Samsung Gear S3 smartwatch, with improved specifications. There are two models of the watch: the Samsung Gear S3 Classic and the LTE version Samsung Gear S3 Frontier.

The top smartwatches that debuted at the 2017 Consumer Electronics Show included the Casio WSD-F20, the Misfit Wearables Vapor and the Garmin Fenix 5 series. On 22 September 2017 Apple released their Apple Watch Series 3 model which offers built in LTE cellular connectivity allowing phone calls, messaging and data without relying on a nearby smartphone connection.

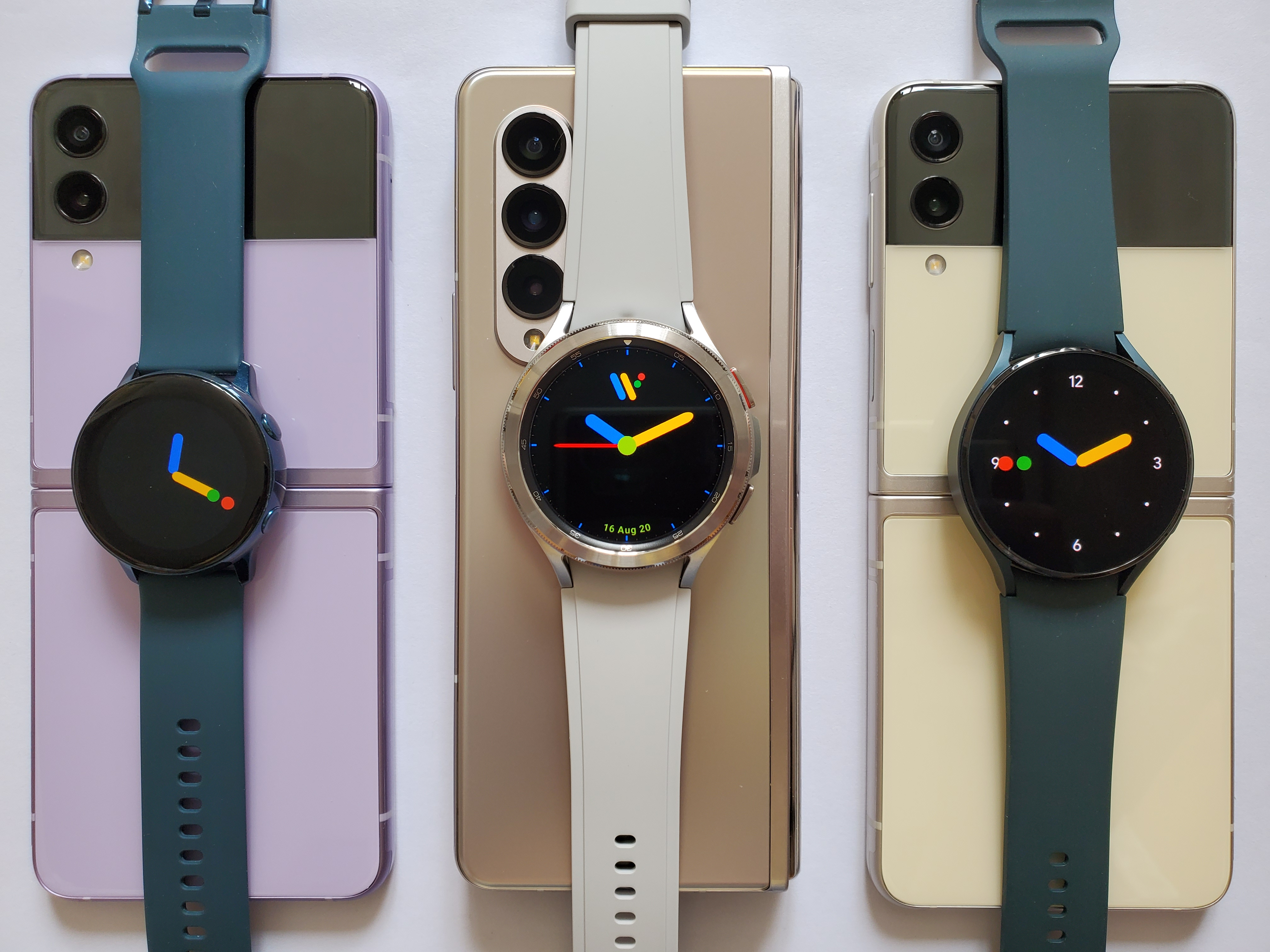
Samsung launched Galaxy Watch with smartphones.

In 2018, Samsung introduced the Samsung Galaxy Watch series.

In its September 2018 keynote, Apple introduced a redesigned Apple Watch Series 4. It featured a larger display with smaller bezels, as well as an EKG feature which is built to detect abnormal heart function.

In Qualcomm's September 2018 presentation, it unveiled its Snapdragon 3100 chip. It is a successor to the Wear 2100, and it includes greater power efficiency, and a separate low power core that can run basic watch functions as well as slightly more advanced functions, such as step tracking.

=== 2020s ===
In 2020, the United States Food and Drug Administration granted marketing approval for an Apple Watch app called NightWare. The app aims to improve sleep for people suffering from PTSD-related nightmares, by vibrating when it detects a nightmare in progress based on heart rate monitoring and body movement.

As of November 2026, smartwatches have advanced significantly, integrating sophisticated health-monitoring features, enhanced connectivity, and practical everyday functionalities. Recent models, such as the Apple Watch Series 12 and Google Pixel Watch 5, include innovations like sleep apnea detection and alerts for abnormal pulse rates. Huawei has introduced technology capable of analyzing cough patterns to identify potential pulmonary issues.

== Market and popularity ==
Smartwatches rose in popularity during the 2010s. Today, they are often used as fitness trackers, and smartphone "companions". According to a study from statista, smartwatch revenue was estimated to reach $44.15 billion by 2023, and revenue per year was expected to continue to grow to $62.46 billion by 2028. The top contributors to the market size of market watches include Apple Inc, Fossil Group Inc, Garmin Lt, Google LLC, Huawei Technologies Co, Samsung, and Xiaomi.

== Typical features ==
Many smartwatch smartphone models manufactured in the 2010s are completely functional as standalone products. Some are used in sports and feature a GPS tracking unit that can record historical data. For example, after a workout, data can be uploaded onto a computer or online in order to create a log of activities for analysis or sharing. Some watches can provide full GPS support, displaying maps and current coordinates, recording tracks, and bookmarking locations. With Apple, Sony, Samsung, and Motorola introducing smartwatch models, 15 percent of tech consumers use wearable technologies, which has attracted advertisers. Advertising on wearable devices was expected to increase heavily by 2017 as advanced hypertargeting modules were introduced to the devices; companies aim to crate advertisements that are tailored for smartwatches.

"Sport watch" functionality often includes activity tracker features, as included on GPS watches made for training, diving, and outdoor sports. Functions may include training programs (such as intervals), lap times, speed display, GPS tracking unit, route tracking, dive computer, heart rate monitor compatibility, Cadence sensor compatibility, and compatibility with sport transitions (as in triathlons). Other watches can cooperate with a smartphone app to execute their functions. They are paired to a smartphone, usually via Bluetooth. Some of these only work with a phone that runs the same mobile operating system; others use an OS that is unique to the watch, or otherwise is able to work with most smartphones. Paired, the watch may function as a remote to the phone. This allows the watch to display data such as calls, SMS messages, emails, calendar invitations, and any data that may be made available by relevant phone apps.

=== LTE ===
From about 2015, several manufacturers began to release smartwatches with LTE support, enabling direct connection to 3G/4G mobile networks for voice and SMS use, without the need to carry a paired smartphone.

== Security and health issues ==
Tests by UK consumer organization Which? found that ultra-cheap smartwatches and fitness trackers sold online often had serious security flaws, including excessive data collection, insecure data storage, the inability to opt out of data collection, and a lack of a security lock function. Typically, a watch app can request permission to collect and store personally identifiable information, and apps can be rendered unusable if permission is denied. The user cannot know if information is being stored securely, and it cannot be deleted. There is no control over whether the supplier views it or sells it on, for whatever purpose. In many cases, data collected is not encrypted when transmitted to the supplier.

Which? did not specifically test the functionality of ultra-cheap watches, but noticed during their security audit that some could detect heart rate, blood oxygen measurements, and steps while not being worn or moved. They said that this "suggests [that] they are at best inaccurate and at worst useless".

In the United Kingdom, a Product Security and Telecoms Infrastructure Act was passed in December 2022, effective from 2024. The Act, which should cover smartwatches, specifies security standards that manufacturers, importers and distributors (including online marketplaces) of smart devices must meet.

A 2024 study by the University of Notre Dame found that some smartwatch straps contain high levels of PFAS, chemical compounds that have been classified as toxic or carcinogenic and might penetrate the skin. The researchers recommend replacing straps containing fluoroelastomer with straps made of silicone, which does not contain PFAS.

== Social implications and biases ==
Due to faults in the design of current smartwatches, hardware and software designs have sometimes favored certain demographics. For example, smartwatches have more accurate tracking of data for individuals who have lighter skin, compared to individuals who have darker skin. This is due to the method that smartwatches use to monitor heart rate. An article published by the Healthcare Degree describes the most common method, in which devices use optical sensors to track the presence of blood in the wrist, indicating a heart beat. This type of lighting technique is cheaper and simple to use than other methods; however, because the green light used has shorter wavelengths, it is less able to penetrate melanin, the pigment which causes darker skin. This can make heart rate tracking for darker-skinned individuals less accurate.

Social consequences from the increase in popularity of smartwatches include data collection and data privacy concerns. Smartwatches are capable of collecting personal health data such as activity levels, heart rate, sleep patterns, and other metrics. This user data is often collected and stored in the cloud, which can sometimes be accessed by companies and researchers, and used for many purposes. There have been many cases of data misuse. One instance published by the Warren Alpert Medical School involved Fitbit facing a lawsuit in 2011 for selling personal health data to advertisers without user consent. Another instance occurred when Strava allowed users to share their routes, which led to the accidental revelation of several military base locations throughout the world.

== Operating systems ==
=== AsteroidOS ===
AsteroidOS is an open source firmware replacement for some Android Wear devices.

=== Flyme OS ===
Flyme OS is firmware based on the Android operating system, developed by Meizu.

=== FreeRTOS ===
FreeRTOS is a real time operating system which has many uses including but not limited to smartwatches. FreeRTOS is licensed under the MIT license. It is designed to have a very low overhead and small file size with the core kernel being able to take up as little as 4-9 kilobytes. One of the main benefits of FreeRTOS other than the license and ability to run on low end hardware is that it uses preemptive task scheduling, meaning high priority tasks can instantly interrupt low priority tasks. This is often useful in medical devices such as pacemakers. This is used for many purposes aside of smartwatches such as in IoT devices such as thermostats, engine control units, microwaves and insulin pumps. FreeRTOS based watches include The Samsung Galaxy Fit3, OnePlus Watch (1st Generation), Moto Watch Fit, Amazfit and many other from brands such as Xiaomi, Realme and CMF as well as many generic unbranded watches or fake versions of popular watches such as those made by Apple or Samsung.

There are also some watches which are dual booted with another OS such as WearOS, usually to conserve battery due to the simplicity of FreeRTOS, examples include the OnePlus Watch 3 and OPPO Watch X.

FreeRTOS also has the ability to be run on inexpensive micro-controllers such as the STM32 making it popular with enthusiasts making DIY smartwatches as well as smartwatch kits like the OV-Watch.

=== InfiniTime ===
InfiniTime is the default firmware for the PineTime smartwatch, produced by Pine64. It is a community project based on FreeRTOS, as well as being free software licensed under the GNU General Public License. It supports Android, desktop Linux, the PinePhone, and SailfishOS as companion devices for features such as music playback, call and text notifications, navigation instructions, and time synchronization.

As of January 2022, Infinitime version 1.8's additional features include secure Bluetooth pairing, customisable watch faces, a flashlight, basic paint program, stopwatch, alarm clock, countdown timer, step counter, heart rate monitor, a one-player pong clone, a numerical puzzle game and a metronome. Features are under ongoing development, with firmware updates available via GitHub.

=== HarmonyOS ===
HarmonyOS is an operating system developed by Huawei, intended for the various "smart" devices they manufacture. Starting in 2021, it has seen use in Huawei Watches, replacing its predecessor, LiteOS.

=== Sailfish OS ===
Sailfish OS is a Linux-based operating system for various platforms, including Sailfish smartwatches.

=== Tizen ===
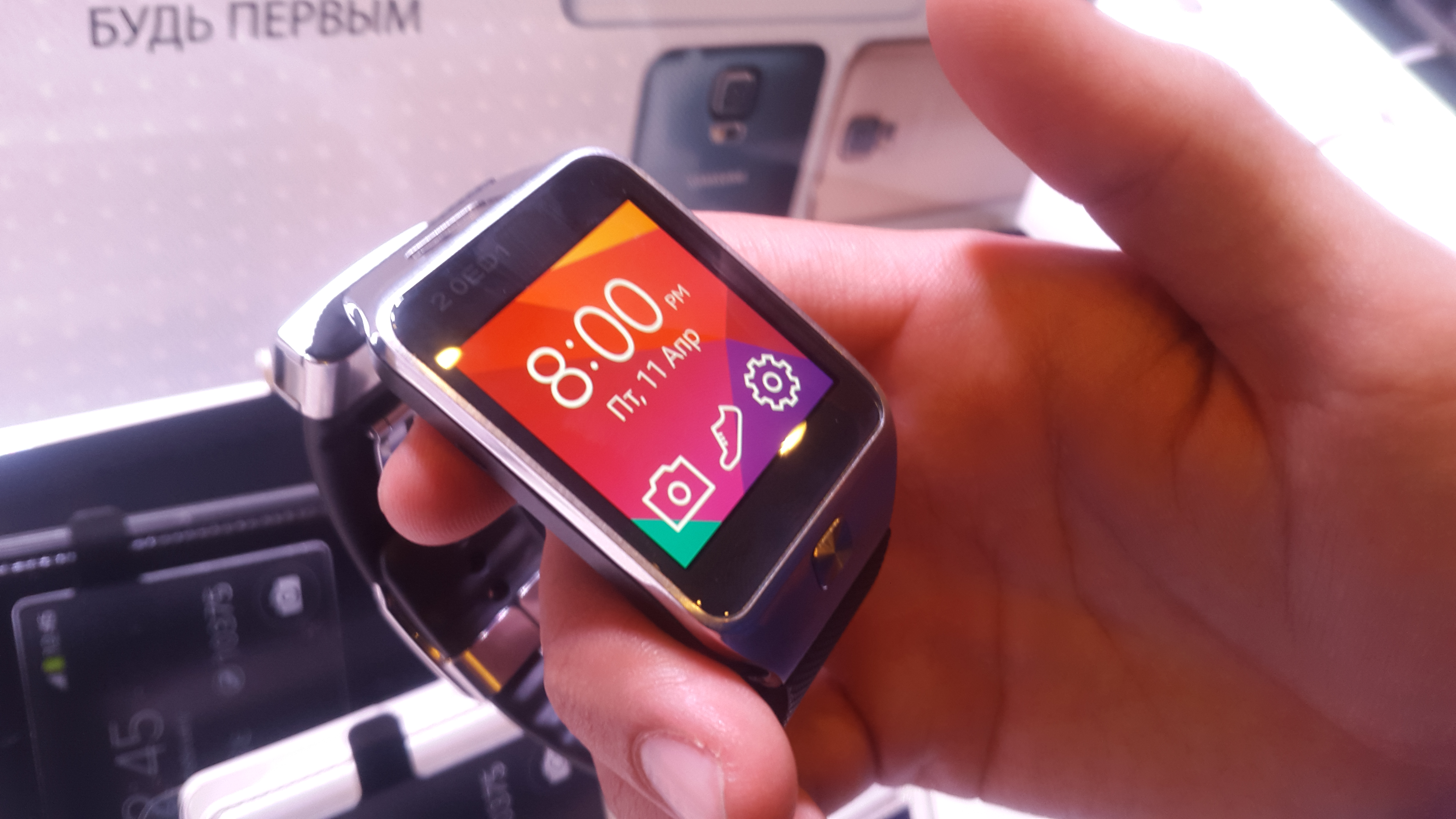
Tizen in a Samsung Gear2

Tizen is a Linux-based operating system developed for various platforms, including smartwatches. Tizen is a project within the Linux Foundation and is governed by a Technical Steering Group (TSG) composed of Samsung and Intel among others. Samsung released the Samsung Gear 2, Gear 2 Neo, Samsung Gear S, Samsung Gear S2 and Samsung Gear S3, all running Tizen.

=== watchOS ===
watchOS is a proprietary mobile operating system developed by Apple Inc. to run on the Apple Watch.

=== Wear OS ===
Wear OS, previously known as Android Wear, is a smartwatch operating system developed by Google Inc.

== For children and the elderly ==
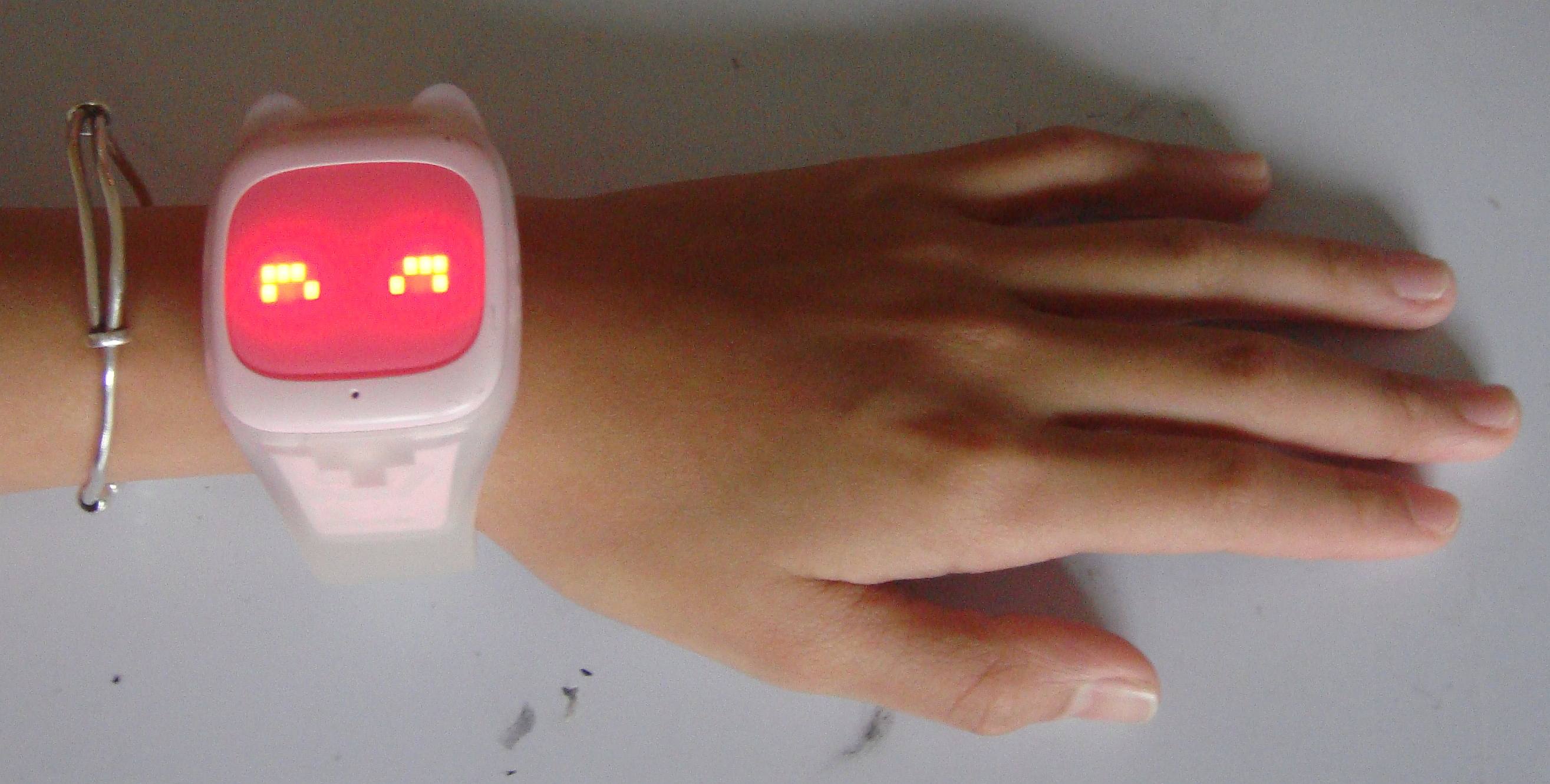

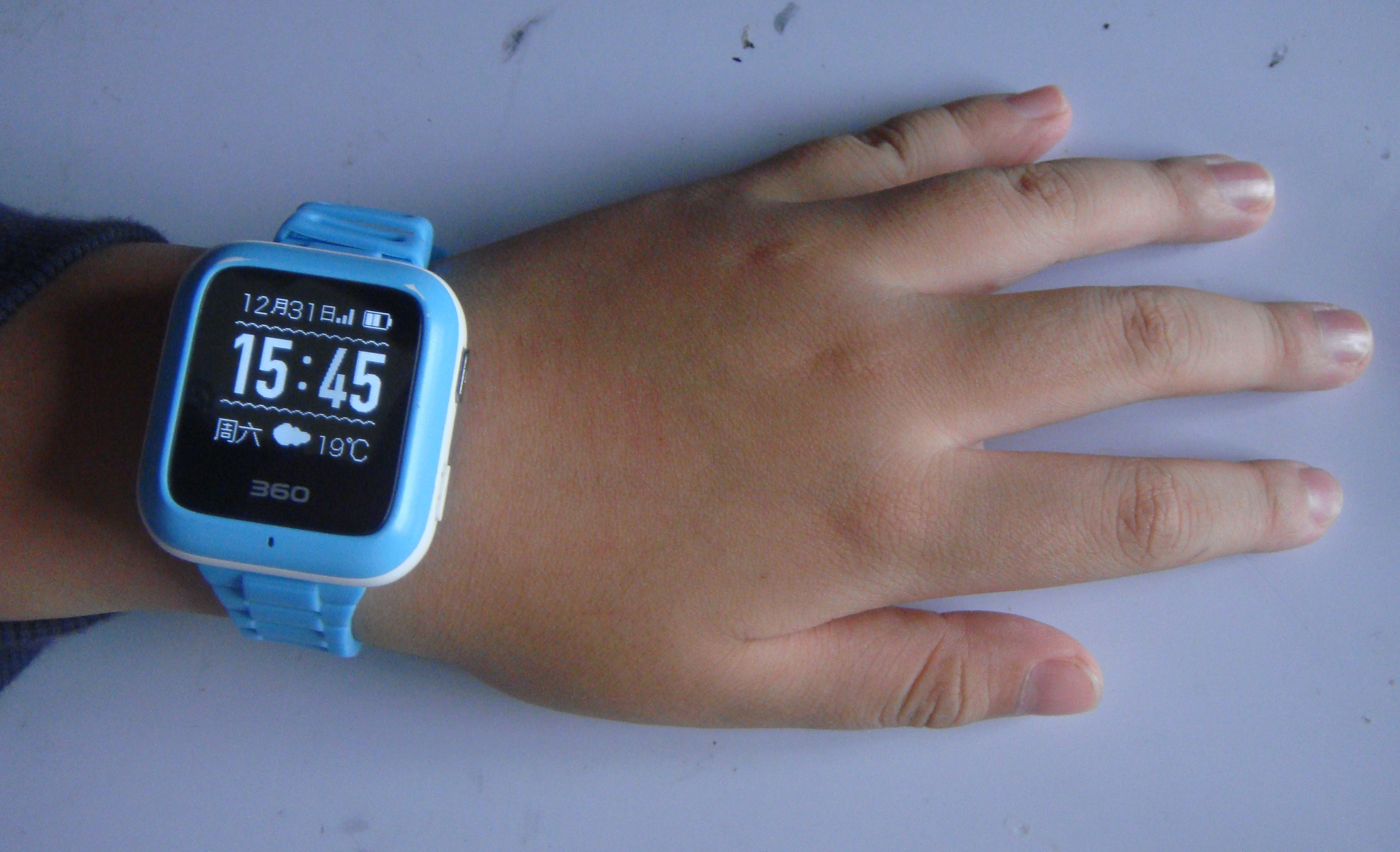

In China, since around 2015, smartwatches have become widely used by schoolchildren, and are widely advertised on Chinese television as a safety device for them. The devices are typically colorful and made of plastic, and they often lack a display unless a button is pressed. While their functionality is limited, they primarily allow children to make and receive calls, display the time, and sometimes measure air temperature. These smartwatches typically cost between US$100 and US$200.

Children's smartwatches are also sold in other countries.

Some smartwatches can also help elderly or disabled people, reporting their location to a caretaker if they fall or become lost.

== Smart strap ==
A "smart strap" is a technology that is capable of providing enhanced functionality to smartwatches, through built-in sensors located within the strap. For example, smart strap accessories can add a webcam, ECG sensor and bioelectrical impedance (BIA) measurement features.

== See also ==
- Android
- Artificial neural membrane (smartskin)
- Automatic parking and connected car
- Button cell
- Calculator watch
- Clock face
- E-ink
- Fitness tracker
- GPS watch
- G-Shock
- IP Code
- Key finder
- Open-source computing hardware
- Personal organizer
- Remote shutter
- Rollable display
- Smart band
- Quantified self logging
- Lifelog
- Smartglasses
- Smart keychain (NFC keychain)
- Smartphone
- Wear OS
- Wearable computer
