= Ian Clark (director) =

English film director and screenwriter

- Born: Mossley (Tameside), Lancashire
- Education: Poynton High School; National Film and Television School
- Occupation: Film director
- Years active: 2002–present
- Spouse: Katerina Athanasopoulou (2006–present)

Ian Clark is an English film director and screenwriter.

== Early life ==
Ian Clark was raised in Disley, Cheshire, the son of Monica Clark (née Holt), a teacher and lecturer and Michael (Mick) Clark, an IT Manager. He was educated at Poynton High School, Cheshire, and later went on to study Fine Art at Manchester Metropolitan University and Graphic Design and Animation at University of Staffordshire. It was at university that he started to develop an interest in film making.

== Career ==
In 2002 he made his second short film, Def, which was produced with funding from Short Circuits Commissions in Yorkshire and premiered at the Leeds International Film Festival in October 2002.The film won best short film in Leeds and went on to win the Grand Prize at PiFan in South Korea and the Jury Prize at the New York International Children's Film Festival as well as many other awards.Def tells the story of Tony, a deaf boy from Yorkshire who dreams of becoming a rapper. While the other kids on his estate make fun of him and his friend Mike, Tony retreats into a fantasy of performing as deaf M.C, ‘Ice Finga'.

During 2006 and 2007 he studied at the National Film and Television School and completed an MA in Directing Fiction. He attended the 2008 Edinburgh Film Festival as a Skillset Trailblazer where his graduation film Outcasts premiered. Outcasts, a road movie with a difference in which “a gang of outcasts hit the road to take on the world”, won awards at festivals around the world including the FujiFilm Short Film Competition, Royal Television Society Student Awards and Look & Roll Disability Film Festival, Munich. It was also selected for Virgin Atlantic’s Film Festival in the Sky where Alan Parker, one of the judges, commented “ Outcasts was so brave – the kind of balls and bravery only seen at the film school.” On graduating from the NFTS he was mentored by the director Chris Smith as part of Guiding Lights, "Europe’s most prestigious film mentoring scheme". Majority funded by Creative Skillset, the programme supports upcoming filmmakers and professionals through high-level mentoring, complemented by a range of training and networking activities.

In 2009 his short film Jenny and the Worm, produced with funding from Film London's Digital Shorts scheme, premiered at the London Film Festival. The film went on to win a number of awards at festivals round the world, including a Jury Special Mention at the Clermont-Ferrand International Short Film Festival.

In 2011 he wrote and directed The Facility (originally titled Guinea Pigs), starring Aneurin Barnard, Oliver Coleman, Steve Evets, Skye Lourie, Alex Reid, Nia Roberts & Amit Shah. The film is a micro-budget British medical-horror film centered on seven volunteers in a clinical trial that goes horrifically wrong. It was the first film made by the Vertigo School Project, a joint venture by Vertigo Films and the NFTS, designed to allow NFTS students to create feature films. The Facility premiered at the Edinburgh International Film Festival on 23 June 2012 where it was selected to be part of the "Best of the Fest" programme. The film was released by Momentum Pictures in May 2013.

In 2012 he directed Fox Hollow Farm, an episode of Paranormal Witness, Season 2 for Raw TV and the Syfy channel. It was first screened on 26 September 2012 in the USA and on 6 December 2012 in the UK.This was followed by two episodes of a docudrama, Ultimate Warfare for Military Channel and Arrow Media. The films were first screened on 12 February 2013 and 12 March 2013 in the USA and during September 2013 in the UK.

In 2014 he directed two TV series for Arrow Media:See No Evil, a series of modern mysteries using real surveillance footage and Planes That Changed The World.See No Evil had its world premiere in November 2014 on Slice TV in Canada and was screened in the USA by Investigation Discovery in February 2015. Kelsey Smith was the first episode of the series shown in the USA and achieved record breaking viewing figures for the channel . Planes That Changed The World was premiered in the UK in March 2015 on Quest.

In 2015 he produced and directed two episodes of the TV series Manhunt: Kill or Capture for World Media Rights. The series had its world premiere in August 2015 on American Heroes Channel in the USA. Following the success of the first season of See No Evil, a second one was commissioned from Arrow Media and Clark directed five episodes. The series was premiered on the Investigation Discovery Channel in February 2016. .

At the beginning of 2016 Arrow Media was commissioned by Investigation Discovery to produce a new TV series: American Monster (originally titled Devil In Disguise) with Clark directing two episodes. It comprises a series of non-fiction crime dramas that get “closer than ever to some of the country's most shocking and surprising crimes.” The series was premiered on the Investigation Discovery Channel in June 2016. Later in 2016 he produced and directed two episodes of Autopsy: The Last Hours Of... for Potato, part of ITV Studios. The subjects of these episodes were the actor Corey Haim and the comedian Chris Farley. The series was initially screened on the Reelz channel in November 2016.

In 2017 a second season of American Monster was made with Clark directing four episodes. The first episode had its premiere on 9 July 2017 on Investigation Discovery. Later in the year he produced and directed two further episodes of Autopsy: The Last Hours Of... (season 9). The subjects of these episodes were Andy Warhol and the singer Cass Elliot from the Mamas & the Papas. The episodes were initially screened on the Reelz channel on 25 March 2018 and 22 April 2018 respectively.

In 2018 another new series was developed by Arrow Media. What Lies Beneath is a true crime drama documentary and Clark produced and directed the first two episodes. The programme gives the real-footage murder genre a new twist by using real courtroom footage, CCTV and home movies as well as surrounding news coverage. The series was initially shown on Investigation Discovery in September and October 2018. Later in 2018 he directed 2 episodes of season 5 of See No Evil. The series premiered on Investigation Discovery in April 2019.

In 2019 he directed 2 episodes of a new drama documentary, Predator at Large, for October Studios. The series premiered in April 2020 on Investigation Discovery.

== Filmography ==
=== Feature films ===
- The Facility (2011)
- A Morning Light (2016)

=== Television ===
- Fox Hollow Farm (2012) An episode of Paranormal Witness, Season 2 episode 8
- Courage at Sea, the battle of Leyte Gulf (2013) An episode of Ultimate Warfare, Season 1 episode 5
- Midway:Taking Back the Pacific (2013) An episode of Ultimate Warfare, Season 1 episode 7
- Skylar Neese (2014) An episode of See No Evil, Season 1 episode 2
- Kelsey Smith (2014) An episode of See No Evil, Season 1 episode 3
- DC3 (2015) An episode of Planes That Changed The World, Season 1 episode 1
- Airbus A380 – Giant of the Sky (2015) ) An episode of Planes That Changed The World, Season 1 episode 2
- SR – 71 Blackbird – Hypersonic Surveillance (2015) An episode of Planes That Changed The World, Season 1 episode 3
- Manhunt: Kill or Capture (2015)
- Good Samaritan (2016) An episode of See No Evil, Series 2 episode 2
- Rick Chance (2016) An episode of See No Evil, Series 2 episode 11
- Someone to Watch Over Her (2016) An episode of See No Evil, Series 2 episode 12
- Appalachian Horror Film (2016) An episode of American Monster, Series 1 episode 2
- Right Before Your Eyes (2016) An episode of American Monster, Series 1 episode 6
- Chris Farley (2016) An episode of Autopsy: The Last Hours Of.. Season 7 episode 1
- Corey Haim (2016) An episode of Autopsy: The Last Hours Of.. Season 7 episode 2
- American Monster (2017) Season 2 (4 episodes)
- Autopsy: The Last Hours Of.. (2018) Season 9 (2 episodes)
- What Lies Beneath (2018) Season 1 (2 episodes)
- See No Evil (2019) Season 5 (2 episodes)
- Predator at Large (2020) Season 1 (2 episodes)

=== Short films ===
- Def (2002)
- Flats (2006)
- Smile (2007)
- Outcasts (2008)
- Jenny and the Worm (2009)

== Personal life ==
He is married to the Greek film maker Katerina Athanasopoulou and lives in London. He has a brother, Richard, who is a teacher.
