= SEA Foundation Tilburg =

SEA Foundation
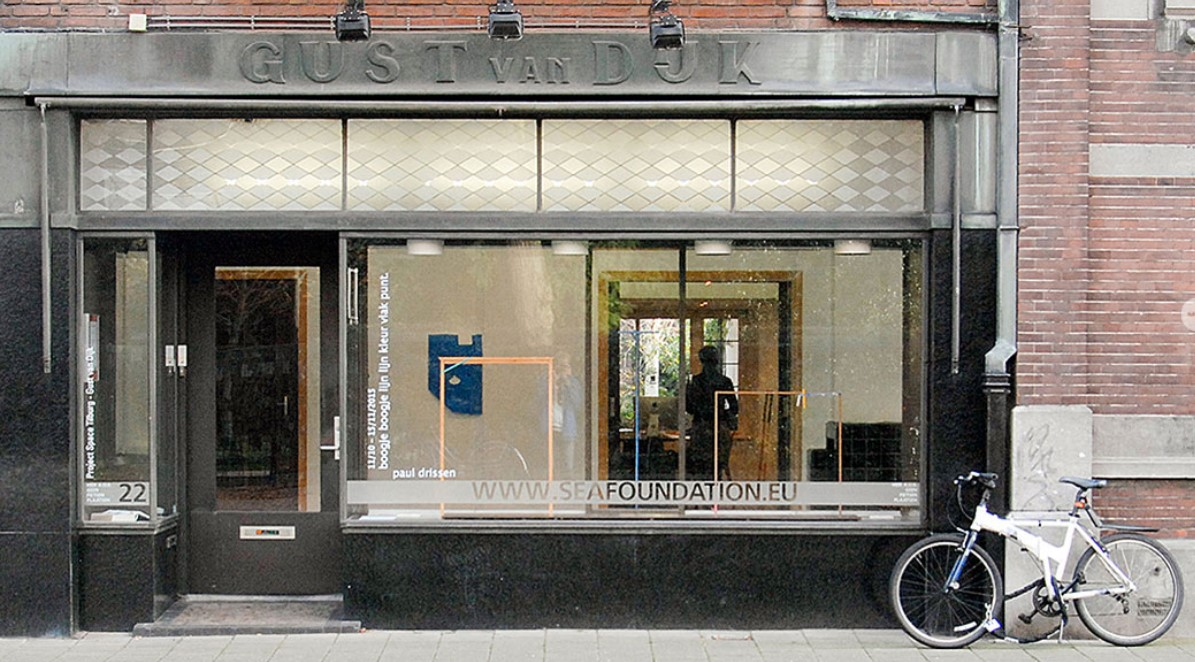
- Front of SEA Foundation
- Established: January 1, 2013
- Location: Tilburg
- Coordinates: 51°33′31″N 5°05′39″E
- Type: Art Museum, Art Gallery
- Curator: Riet van Gerven
- Website: https://www.seafoundation.eu

SEA Foundation is a Dutch non-profit, artist-led organisation in Tilburg, The Netherlands established in 2013. SEA Foundation provides residencies for artistic research, experimentation, and production out of which an ongoing public programme emerges. This programme consists of exhibitions, screenings, talks, workshops and publications. It focuses on challenging perceptions of what constitutes as contemporary art, and to bring the audience closer to the practices that motivate producing contemporary art.

SEA Foundation was founded by Jan-Willem van Rijnberk and Yvonne Elias.

== History ==
SEA Foundation is located on the Tivolistraat, in the city center of Tilburg. The building where the SEA Foundation is housed originally belonged to the Tilburg-based tobacco merchant Gust van Dijk (1884–1977). In the 1930s, Gust van Dijk commissioned the construction of a retail residence in the style of the New Objectivity, on the former Bosscheweg in Tilburg. The building includes a gallery on the ground floor and two Artist in Residence studios to facilitate professional artists, curators and writers.

== Organization ==
SEA Foundation is a non-profit organization. SEA Foundation works according to an agile, holacratic model. In a holacratic model, the aim is driven by a social organisation model based on self-directed teams. In a holacracy, participants have to take on multiple roles. Roles can partially overlap, creating different circles of activities, where the organization as a whole is the overarching circle. SEA Foundation is member of Res Artis, an international network for artist residencies. In 2019, SEA Foundation partnered with Cove Park in Scotland to stimulate artist exchanges.

== Residencies ==
Tailor-made residencies with the goal of deepening and developing one's artistic practice, are the core activity of SEA Foundation. The residency program AiR Tilburg, which was founded in 2013, is intended to provide professionals in the visual arts with the opportunity for artistic research and facilitate new productions. SEA Foundation offers approximately eight residencies a year. Residents are selected by means of nominations or through an annual open call. Former residents of SEA Foundation include a.o. Eloísa Ibarra, Ilja Leonard Pfeijffer, Yelena Popova and Thomas Braida.

== Selection of recent exhibitions ==
- 2013 – Max Hattler – A Very Large Increase in the Size, Amount or Importance of Something Over a Very Short Period of Time (2012) and X (2012) during Playgrounds Festival
- 2013 – John Dyer Baizley – The Virgin Spring in collaboration with Roadburn Festival
- 2015 - Katerina Athanasopoulou – The Architecture of Melancholy : Ruins
- 2016 – Claudia de la Torre – BackBoneBooks
- 2016 – Jens Standke – A Tape Runs On in Silence in collaboration with Incubate (festival)
- 2018 – Mila Lanfermeijer – Ever so Humble, Ever so Proud
- 2018 – Iwona Rozbiewska – The Tales That Follow
- 2019 – Jon Tarry – Catching the Moment
- 2019 – Collette Rayner – I Presume You Pictured it Differently
- 2020 – Freja Niemann Lundrup – Making the Unseen Seen
