= List of Autopsy: The Last Hours of... episodes =

The following is a list of episodes of the documentary series Autopsy: The Last Hours of..., created by Potato, a subsidiary of ITV Studios, for Channel 5 in the UK, and broadcast by Reelz in the US. The television series aired for 14 seasons, between 2014 and 2023.

== Series Overview ==
Season	Episodes	Originally released	
Season	Episodes	First released	Last released
1	3	January 7, 2014	January 21, 2014
2	3	July 24, 2014	August 7, 2014
3	3	December 2, 2014	May 6, 2015
4	4	January 30, 2015	November 16, 2015
5	5	July 19, 2015	February 10, 2016
6	10	January 30, 2016	March 4, 2017
7	10	November 19, 2016	April 1, 2017
8	10	May 20, 2017	July 22, 2017
9	26	February 11, 2018	October 6, 2018
10	18	February 10, 2019	December 29, 2019
11	23	February 16, 2020	December 13, 2020
12	23	April 11, 2021	August 1, 2021
13	20	May 1, 2022	March 19, 2023
14	6	April 23, 2023	June 4, 2023

== Season 1 (January 7, 2014 – January 21, 2014) ==
No. overall	No. in season	Title	Original release date
1	1	"Michael Jackson"	January 7, 2014 (Note: This episode would be revisited in December 2020)
2	2	"Whitney Houston"	January 14, 2014 (Note: This episode would be revisited in October 2020)
3	3	"Anna Nicole Smith"	January 21, 2014 (Note: This episode would be revisited in August 2020)

== Season 2 (July 24, 2014 – August 7, 2014) ==
No. overall	No. in season	Title	Original release date
4	1	"Michael Hutchence"	July 24, 2014 (Note: This episode would be revisited in February 2021)
5	2	"Karen Carpenter"	July 31, 2014 (Note: This episode would be revisited in August 2020)
6	3	"Brittany Murphy"	August 7, 2014 (Note: This episode would be revisited in August 2020)

== Season 3 (December 2, 2014 – May 13, 2015) ==
No. overall	No. in season	Title	Original release date
7	1	"Elvis Presley"	December 2, 2014 (Note: This episode would be revisited in August 2020)
8	2	"Nicole Brown Simpson and Ron Goldman"	April 29, 2015 (Note: This episode would be revisited in July 2020)
9	3	"River Phoenix"	May 6, 2015 (Note: This episode would be revisited in June 2020)

== Season 4 (September 28, 2015 – December 10, 2015) ==
No. overall	No. in season	Title	Original release date
10	1	"Robin Williams"	September 28, 2015 (Note: This episode would be revisited in June 2020)
11	2	"Marilyn Monroe"	January 30, 2015 (Note: This episode would be revisited in August 2020)
12	3	"Liberace"	April 6, 2015 (Note: This episode would be revisited in July 2021)
13	4	"George Best"	November 16, 2015 (Note: This episode would be revisited in May 2021)

== Season 5 (January 30, 2016 – February 27, 2016) ==
No. overall	No. in season	Title	Original release date
14	1	"Amy Winehouse"	September 28, 2015 (Note: This episode would be revisited in August 2020)
15	2	"Heath Ledger"	October 5, 2015 (Note: This episode was revisited in June 2020)
16	3	"Joan Rivers"	October 12, 2015 (Note: This episode was revisited in June 2020)
17	4	"Philip Seymour Hoffman"	February 10, 2016 (Note: This episode was revisited in April 2021)
18	5	"Bobbi Kristina Brown"	July 19, 2015 (Note: This episode was revisited in October 2020)

== Season 6 (March 19, 2016 – April 2, 2016) ==
No. overall	No. in season	Title	Original release date
19	1	"Natalie Wood"	January 30, 2016
20	2	"John Belushi"	March 4, 2017
21	3	"Jimi Hendrix"	March 12, 2016
22	4	"Jim Morrison"	February 13, 2016
23	5	"Donda West"	February 20, 2016
24	6	"Maurice Gibb"	March 19, 2016 (Note: This episode would be revisited in April 2021)
25	7	"Rodney King"	February 27, 2016
26	8	"The Notorious B.I.G."	March 26, 2016
27	9	"Phil Hartman"	February 6, 2016
28	10	"Don Cornelius"	April 2, 2016

== Season 7 (November 19, 2016 – April 1, 2017) ==
No. overall	No. in season	Title	Original release date
29	1	"Chris Farley"	November 19, 2016
30	2	"Corey Haim"	November 28, 2016
31	3	"Cory Monteith"	December 3, 2016
32	4	"Casey Kasem"	December 10, 2016
33	5	"Steve McQueen"	January 28, 2017
34	6	"Kurt Cobain"	February 4, 2017
35	7	"Bob Marley"	February 25, 2017
36	8	"Dennis Wilson"	March 18, 2017
37	9	"Richard Pryor"	March 25, 2017
38	10	"John Denver"	April 1, 2017

== Season 8 (May 20, 2017 – July 22, 2017) ==
No. overall	No. in season	Title	Original release date
39	1	"Prince"	May 20, 2017
40	2	"Natalie Cole"	May 27, 2017
41	3	"Patrick Swayze"	June 3, 2017
42	4	"Steve Jobs"	June 10, 2017
43	5	"Bernie Mac"	June 17, 2017
44	6	"Gary Coleman"	June 24, 2017 (Note: This episode was revisited in October 2021)
45	7	"Janis Joplin"	July 1, 2017
46	8	"Judy Garland"	July 8, 2017
47	9	"Bruce Lee"	July 15, 2017
48	10	"Anissa Jones"	July 22, 2017

== Season 9 (February 11, 2018 – October 6, 2018) ==
No. overall	No. in season	Title	Original release date
49	1	"James Gandolfini"	February 11, 2018
50	2	"Mindy McCready"	February 18, 2018
51	3	"Marvin Gaye"	February 25, 2018
52	4	"Mary Tyler Moore"	March 4, 2018
53	5	"Farrah Fawcett"	March 11, 2018
54	6	"Andy Kaufman"	March 18, 2018
55	7	"Andy Warhol"	March 25, 2018
56	8	"Muhammad Ali"	April 1, 2018
57	9	"Miles Davis"	April 8, 2018
58	10	"James Brown"	April 15, 2018
59	11	"Cass Elliot"	April 22, 2018
60	12	"James Dean"	April 29, 2018
61	13	"Elizabeth Taylor"	May 6, 2018
62	14	"George Michael"	June 3, 2018
63	15	"George Harrison"	June 10, 2018
64	16	"David Bowie"	June 17, 2018
65	17	"Johnny Cash"	June 24, 2018
66	18	"Lou Reed"	July 8, 2018
67	19	"Gram Parsons"	July 15, 2018
68	20	"Roy Orbison"	July 22, 2018
69	21	"Florence Ballard"	July 29, 2018
70	22	"Chris Cornell"	August 12, 2018
71	23	"Hugh Hefner"	August 19, 2018
72	24	"Tammy Wynette"	September 9, 2018
73	25	"Carrie Fisher"	September 16, 2018
74	26	"Barry White"	October 6, 2018

== Season 10 (February 10, 2019 - December 29, 2019) ==
No. overall	No. in season	Title	Original release date
75	1	"Christopher Reeve"	February 10, 2019
76	2	"Rue McClanahan"	February 17, 2019
77	3	"Donna Summer"	February 24, 2019
78	4	"John Candy"	March 3, 2019
79	5	"Lucille Ball"	March 10, 2019
80	6	"Jeff Conaway"	March 17, 2019
81	7	"Lisa Lopes"	March 24, 2019
82	8	"Howard Hughes"	March 31, 2019
83	9	"Michael Landon"	April 7, 2019
84	10	"Michael Clarke Duncan"	April 14, 2019
85	11	"Davy Jones"	July 28, 2019
86	12	"Luther Vandross"	August 4, 2019
87	13	"Rick James"	August 4, 2019
88	14	"Aaron Hernandez"	August 25, 2019
89	15	"Chyna"	August 25, 2019
90	16	"Garry Shandling"	September 2, 2019
91	17	"Gregg Allman"	December 1, 2019
92	18	"Prodigy"	December 29, 2019

== Season 11 (February 16, 2020 - December 13, 2020) ==
No. overall	No. in season	Title	Original release date
93	1	"Florence Henderson"	February 16, 2020
94	2	"Alan Thicke"	February 23, 2020
95	3	"Andy Gibb"	March 1, 2020
96	4	"Dana Plato"	March 8, 2020
97	5	"Chris Benoit"	March 15, 2020
98	6	"Audrey Hepburn"	March 22, 2020
99	7	"Glen Campbell"	March 29, 2020
100	8	"Jeffrey Epstein"	April 5, 2020
101	9	"Desi Arnaz"	June 7, 2020
102	10	"Patty Duke"	June 7, 2020
103	11	"Adam West"	June 14, 2020
104	12	"Bill Bixby"	June 14, 2020
105	13	"John Ritter"	July 19, 2020
106	14	"Gilda Radner"	July 26, 2020
107	15	"David Cassidy"	August 2, 2020
108	16	"Larry Hagman"	August 2, 2020
109	17	"Walt Disney"	August 9, 2020
110	18	"Dick Clark"	August 9, 2020
111	19	"Billy Mays"	August 9, 2020
112	20	"Burt Reynolds"	August 16, 2020
113	21	"Marlon Brando"	August 23, 2020
114	22	"Debbie Reynolds"	August 23, 2020
115	23	"Tom Petty"	December 13, 2020

== Season 12 (April 11, 2021 - August 1, 2021) ==
No. overall	No. in season	Title	Original release date
116	1	"Dale Earnhardt"	April 11, 2021
117	2	"Randy Savage"	April 11, 2021
118	3	"John Wayne"	April 18, 2021
119	4	"Dennis Hopper"	April 18, 2021
120	5	"Anthony Bourdain"	April 25, 2021
121	6	"Aretha Franklin"	May 2, 2021
122	7	"Scott Weiland"	May 9, 2021
123	8	"June Carter Cash"	May 30, 2021
124	9	"Andy Griffith"	June 6, 2021
125	10	"Elizabeth Montgomery"	June 6, 2021
126	11	"Sonny Bono"	June 13, 2021
127	12	"Bob Crane"	June 13, 2021
128	13	"Frank Sinatra"	June 20, 2021
129	14	"Dean Martin"	June 20, 2021
130	15	"Roger Moore"	June 27, 2021
131	16	"Grace Kelly"	June 27, 2021
132	17	"Luke Perry"	July 11, 2021
133	18	"Kate Spade"	July 11, 2021
134	19	"Steve Irwin"	July 18, 2021
135	20	"Roy Horn"	July 18, 2021
136	21	"Leonard Nimoy"	July 25, 2021
137	22	"Verne Troyer"	July 25, 2021
138	23	"Jerry Lewis"	August 1, 2021

== Season 13 (May 1, 2022 - March 19, 2023) ==
No. overall	No. in season	Title	Original release date
139	1	"Ricardo Montalbán"	May 1, 2022
140	2	"André the Giant"	May 8, 2022
141	3	"Eddie Guerrero"	May 8, 2022
142	4	"Telly Savalas"	May 15, 2022
143	5	"James Garner"	May 15, 2022
144	6	"Jacqueline Kennedy Onassis"	May 22, 2022
145	7	"John F. Kennedy Jr."	May 22, 2022
146	8	"Eddie Van Halen"	June 5, 2022
147	9	"Buddy Holly"	August 7, 2022
148	10	"Paul Walker"	August 14, 2022
149	11	"Chadwick Boseman"	August 14, 2022
150	12	"Brandon Lee"	August 14, 2022
151	13	"Johnny Carson"	August 21, 2022
152	14	"Freddie Prinze"	August 21, 2022
153	15	"Owen Hart"	February 5, 2023
154	16	"Rowdy Roddy Piper"	February 5, 2023
155	17	"Jayna Murray"	March 12, 2023
156	18	"Steve Clayton"	March 12, 2023
157	19	"Kat West"	March 19, 2023
158	20	"Connie Dabate"	March 19, 2023

== Season 14 (April 23, 2023 - June 4, 2023) ==
No. overall	No. in season	Title	Original release date
159	1	"Robert Reed"	April 23, 2023
160	2	"Flip Wilson"	April 30, 2023
161	3	"Sammy Davis, Jr."	May 7, 2023
162	4	"Sean Connery"	May 14, 2023
163	5	"Doris Day"	May 21, 2023
164	6	"Eazy-E"	June 4, 2023

== See also ==
- Lists of people by cause of death
- List of deaths from drug overdose and intoxication
