= Matt Nixson =

British journalist, executive and author

- Born: Manchester, England
- Occupations: Journalist, author, PR executive.

Matt Nixson is a British journalist, PR executive and author.

== Early life ==
Born in Manchester, Nixson grew up in Disley, Cheshire, and attended Poynton County High School.

== Education ==
He attended the University of Warwick (1992-1995) where he studied English and American Literature and ran the Offbeat music society, as well as creating and DJing at Supersonic, a Student's Union indie disco, for two years.

== Career ==
After starting his newspaper career in New Smyrna Beach, Florida, Nixson returned to the UK in 1997 and worked for a number of local, regional and national newspapers including the Hendon & Finchley Times, Brighton Argus, Evening Standard, Mail on Sunday, before joining News International in January 2005.

He worked as Features Editor for The News of the World (Jan 2005 - Dec 2010) before being promoted to Head of Features on The Sun (Jan 2011 - July 2011).

In 2012 Nixson began working in PR, initially looking after the family of Stockwell shooting victim Thusha Kamleswaran. In June 2012, he joined AOB PR. He returned to Associated Newspapers in January 2013 and has worked in a series of senior roles, most recently as Books Editor for the Mail on Sunday.

== Legal case ==
Nixson was dismissed from News International in July 2011 at the height of the phone hacking scandal but was told six weeks later that he was of no interest to police investigating allegations of wrongdoing at the company. Media commentator Roy Greenslade revealed in his blog that, four months after his dismissal, Nixson had still not been given a reason for his sacking. However, Greenslade wrote "I have been given information about the reason for his dismissal. It involves a payment though I cannot disclose the details. However, I do know - as the police decision confirms - that it did not involve illegality". It later emerged Nixson had allegedly sanctioned a payment for a story about jailed Soham killer Ian Huntley.

With the support of the NUJ, Nixson subsequently launched legal action against News International for wrongful dismissal, stating that he had never engaged in phone hacking or any other illicit newsgathering activities.

In July 2012, Press Gazette featured Nixson's case in an article entitled "Why has NI put Nixson in suspended animation?". Writing a few days later, Editor Dominic Ponsford revealed the story had "generated the most impassioned response of any story I've worked on at Press Gazette" with "some 150 comments (at the time of writing)". Ponsford wrote that "Journalists from across the industry have put their heads above the parapet with signed comments testifying to Nixson’s professionalism and urging the publisher to either reinstate him or settle the case – thereby allowing him get on with his life and support his family".

The story was subsequently taken up by Martin Bright on his The Spectator blog and Roy Greenslade in The Guardian. The Guardian also reported Nixson was in talks to return to The Sun. On 4 October 2012, Press Gazette reported the case had been settled, with Nixson saying in a statement: "I am particularly grateful to the many journalists, former colleagues and friends in the press, including at News International, who have provided incredible support to me and my family over the last year.” In his Guardian blog, commentator Roy Greenslade wrote: "We cannot know how much Nixson got from News International but I am certain his lawyers performed well on his behalf. The company paid him compensation and his costs, and Press Gazette is suggesting it could have cost the publisher as much as £1m."

== Personal ==
Nixson was born in Manchester and brought up in Cheshire.

He is married with one daughter and one son and lives in South London.
