= Poynton High School =

Location
- Yew Tree Lane; Poynton, Cheshire, SK12 1PU; England; 53.34399°N 2.11163°W

Information
- Type: Academy
- Established: September 1972
- Local authority: Cheshire East
- Trust: True Learning Partnership UID:17110
- Department for Education URN: 146387 Tables
- Ofsted: Reports
- Chair of Governors: April Nolan
- Head teacher: Matthew Dean
- Gender: Coeducational
- Age: 11 to 18
- Enrolment: 1499
- Capacity: 1552
- Houses: Newton, Legh, Vernon, Davenport
- Publication: The Poynton High Flyer
- Website: phs.cheshire.sch.uk

Poynton High School is a coeducational secondary school and sixth form located in Poynton, Cheshire, just outside Greater Manchester. The school was maintained by the Cheshire East Local Education Authority until December 2018 when it converted and became a founder member of the True Learning Partnership. The school was opened in 1972, and was awarded Arts College status in 2002. It has 1,421 pupils between Years 7 and 13 (ages 11–18). This includes a sixth form of 285 pupils.

== Description ==
The school serves the communities of Poynton, Disley, Adlington, Pott Shrigley and further afield out towards Macclesfield and Stockport. This is a relatively advantaged area where a high proportion of adults have received higher education. The proportion of students entitled to free school meals is small. The number of students with learning difficulties or disabilities is well below the national average. The number of students whose first language is not English is well below the national average.

Ofsted have rated the school as 'Good' in December 2015. Poynton High School was previously ranked the best state school in Cheshire East Local Education Authority in 2012, and was rated as an 'outstanding school' by Ofsted at the previous inspections in October 2008.

The school was a maintained school until December 2018, Poynton High School and Lostock Hall Primary School became the founding partners of The TRUE Learning Partnership.

== Academics ==
Students remain in the same tutor group from Year 7 until the end of the Sixth Form in Year 13. Year 7 students balance National Curriculum studies with extra-curricular opportunities. In Years 8 and 9, students work towards achieving a "Cultural Passport."

Alongside GCSEs, in Years 9, 10 and 11, students are supported in learning about personal finance, careers and enterprise opportunities and how to revise and prepare for external examinations effectively. A percentage of student achieve the prestigious EBacc. Most students opt to continue their studies in the sixth form, which prepares students for Oxbridge and Russell Group universities, apprenticeships or employment in diverse fields.

=== Extra curricular activities ===
Students are expected to be involved in the wider school life. This is encouraged through a house and house point system. There are the traditional sports clubs, and performance groups. Poynton enters teams at district, county and national level events. PE staff coach over 20 sports teams. There are opportunities to be involved in the Duke of Edinburgh Award Scheme and trips and visits: ski trip, individual subject trips and field courses, modern foreign language exchanges, Camps International trips and performing arts tours.

== The site ==
With a sports hall, gymnasium, swimming pool, tennis courts, squash courts, outdoor gym and mile track and football and rugby pitches, Poynton High is well equipped for team sports, fitness and wellbeing. The school has a purpose built dance studio, a hall theatre and drama studios. As a performing arts school it has the facilities to teach both the performance side and the technical back stage operations. There is a separate sixth form centre, and a Emotional Health and Wellbeing Centre, with state of the art medical room, to give access to CAMHS workers, first aid officers and intervention managers

== Notable former pupils ==
=== Film and media ===
- David Bowers, film director
- Ian Clark, film director
- Anouska Golebiewski, Big Brother contestant
- Matt Nixson, journalist, former head of features for The Sun newspaper
- Sam Yates, theatre director

=== Politicians ===
- Graham Evans, Baron Evans of Rainow, Conservative MP and Peer
- Tim Roca, Labour MP
- Andrew Stephenson, Conservative MP
- William Wragg, Conservative MP

=== Sports ===
- Dame Sarah Storey, road and track cyclist, and Paralympic Games gold medallist
- Sophie Thornhill, track cyclist, and Paralympic Games gold medallist
- Daniel Pepper, Paralympic swimmer, double IPC world champion
- Tyler Fredricson, Professional Footballer

== Notable former staff members ==
- Jane Brooke, residentiary canon chancellor of Chester Cathedral
- Patsy Calton, former Liberal Democrat MP for Cheadle
