= Fitbit =

Series of activity tracker devices by Google

Google Fitbit
- Developer: Google
- Type: activity tracker, smartwatch
- Operating system: proprietary, Fitbit OS
- Website: store.google.com/category/watches_trackers

Fitbit, sometimes marketed as Google Fitbit, is a line of wireless-enabled wearable technology, physical fitness monitors and activity trackers such as smartwatches, pedometers and monitors for heart rate, quality of sleep, and stairs climbed as well as related software. It operated as an American consumer electronics and fitness company from 2007 to 2021.

The Fitbit brand name was originally owned by Fitbit, Inc., founded by James Park and Eric Friedman. In 2019, Fitbit was the fifth-largest wearable technology company by shipments. The company has sold more than 120 million devices and has 29 million users in over 100 countries.

The company was acquired by Google in January 2021 and was absorbed into the company's hardware division. The Fitbit app was renamed to Google Health in June 2026. Google also introduced Google Health Coach (formerly Fitbit Coach) and the Fitbit Air.

== History ==
Fitbit LLC
- Formerly: Healthy Metrics Research, Inc.; Fitbit, Inc.
- Traded as: Nasdaq: FIT
- Industry: Consumer electronics
- Founded: March 26, 2007; 19 years ago in Delaware, U.S.
- Founders: James Park; Eric Friedman
- Defunct: January 14, 2021
- Fate: Absorbed into Google
- Products: See List of Fitbit products
- Website: fitbit.com

Fitbit LLC was founded as Healthy Metrics Research, Inc. in San Francisco, California, on March 26, 2007, by James Park (CEO) and Eric Friedman (CTO). In October 2007, it changed its name to Fitbit, Inc.

In January 2015, the company successfully defended against a trademark lawsuit from Fitbug. On March 5, 2015, Fitbit acquired Fitstar, a fitness coaching app developer, for $17.8 million. In June 2015, the company became a public company via an initial public offering, raising $732 million. In May 2016, Fitbit acquired a wearable payment platform from smart credit card company Coin. In October 2016, CEO James Park announced that the company was undergoing a major transformation from what he called a "consumer electronics company" to a "digital healthcare company". On December 6, 2016, Fitbit acquired assets from Pebble for $23 million. On January 10, 2017, Fitbit acquired Romania-based smartwatch startup Vector Watch SRL.

On February 13, 2018, Fitbit acquired Twine Health. In February 2018, Fitbit announced a partnership with Adidas to release an Adidas-branded Fitbit Ionic; it was released on March 19, 2018. In August 2018, Blue Cross Blue Shield Association (BCBS) announced a partnership with Fitbit in which BCBS included Fitbit's wearables and fitness trackers in its Blue365 program.

=== Acquisition by Google ===
In January 2021, Fitbit was acquired by Google for $2.1 billion and incorporated into its hardware division. The acquisition was scrutinized by regulators concerned over Google's access to personal data in both the United States and Europe. James Park remained as vice president and general manager of Fitbit after the acquisition.

In August 2022, Google rebranded their Fitbit devices as "Fitbit by Google" on Fitbit's website and the Google Store. On March 18, 2024, Google changed the brand name to Google Fitbit, removing the arrow icon and using Google Sans as the wordmark.

In January 2024, it was reported that co-founders James Park and Eric Friedman were leaving the company following a reorganization of Google's hardware teams.

In August 2024, Google discontinued Fitbit smartwatches to focus on the Pixel Watch line. Sandeep Waraich, Google's director of product management for Pixel wearables, stated Pixel Watch is the "next iteration of smartwatch" for Fitbit. The Fitbit brand remained on trackers and apps.

In May 2026, it was announced that the Fitbit app would be renamed to Google Health on May 19, 2026. Along with the rename, Google introduced the Google Health Coach (formerly Fitbit Coach) and the Fitbit Air.

== Products ==
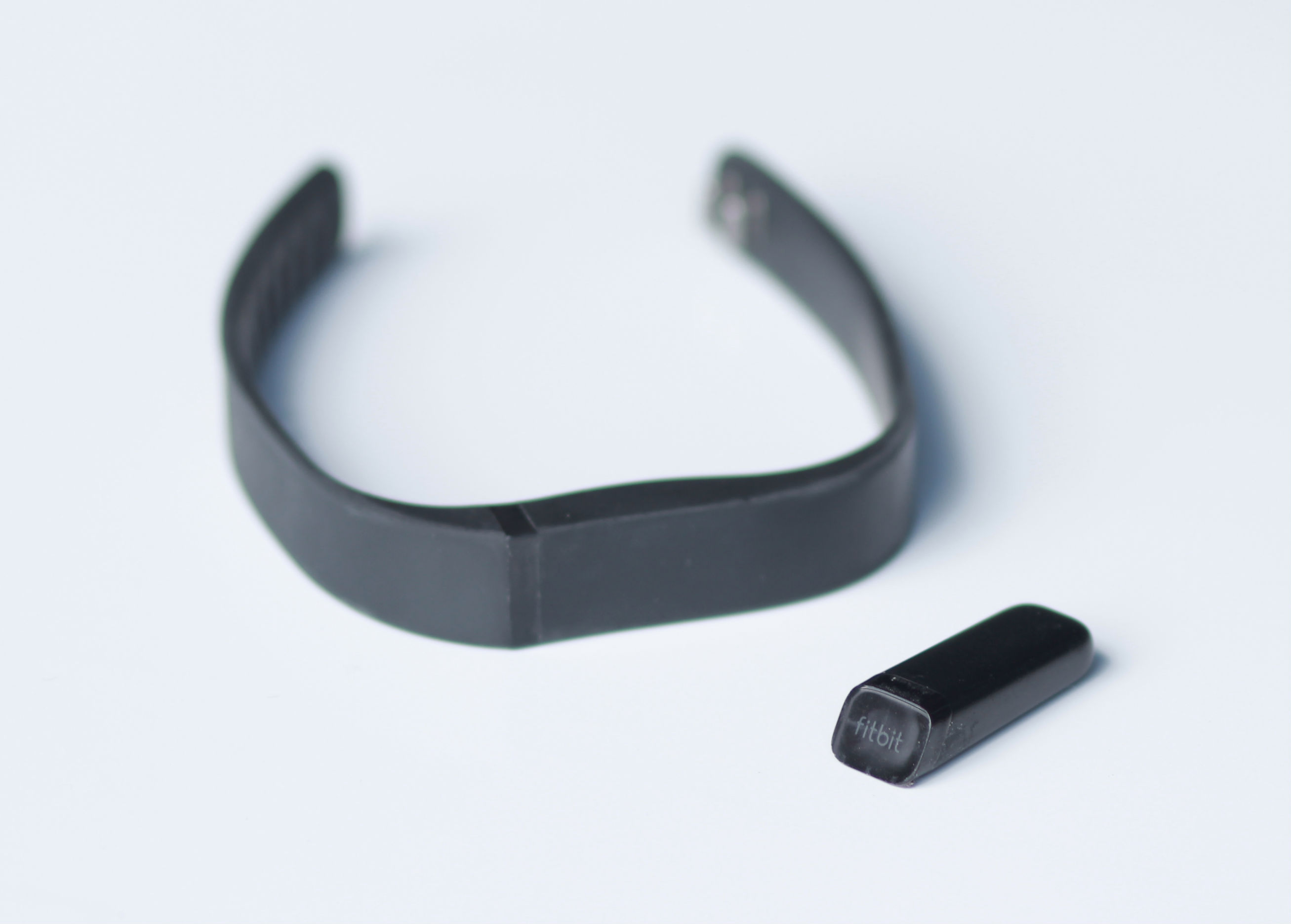
Fitbit Flex, with the functioning unit removed from the replaceable wristband

The first product released was the Fitbit Tracker, launched in 2009.

In 2012, Fitbit began offering activity trackers, along with a website and a mobile app for iOS, Android and Windows 10 Mobile. This allowed the trackers to sync to devices such as mobile phones via Bluetooth, or to a Bluetooth-equipped computer running Windows or MacOS. Users had the ability to log their food, activities, and weight, to track over time and set daily and weekly goals for themselves for steps, calories burned and consumed, and distance walked. The app also offered a community page where users can challenge themselves and compete with others. The social element anticipated an increase in motivation, and found users take an average of 700 more steps per day when they have friends on the app. Users can also choose to share their progress pictures and achievement badges.

In 2017, the company released its Fitbit Ionic smartwatch, and in 2018, it released a redesigned, lower-priced version of the smartwatch called the Versa.

The Fitbit Charge 3, a wristband health and fitness tracker introduced in October 2018, was the first device to feature an oxygen saturation (SpO_{2}) sensor. The Charge 3 came with two different-sized bands: small and large. The small band is around between 5.5–7.1 inches (14–18 cm) and the large band is 7.1–8.7 inches (18–22 cm). The screen is approximately 40% larger than the Charge 2's. Charge 3 comes in two color combos: a Rose-Gold case with a Blue Grey band and a "Graphite Aluminum" screen case with a Black band.

On December 17, 2018, Fitbit released Fitbit OS 3.0, which included an extended dashboard, quick logging for weight and water intake, and goal-based exercise mode. The new extended on-device dashboard (Fitbit Today) included more data regarding sleep, water intake, and weight.

There was three versions of the Fitbit Versa, standard, Special, and Lite.

In December 2018, Fitbit added an API and open-source tools to help developers build better apps for its smartwatch products.

On January 2, 2019, the company announced the release of the Fitbit Charge 3 in India.

On June 3, 2020, during the COVID-19 pandemic, the company announced Fitbit Flow, a ventilator in response to the shortages of ventilators in medical centers and hospitals around the world which were needed to treat critically ill patients. The ventilators received emergency approval from the Food and Drug Administration and the company stated the product was intended as an alternative when the more expensive traditional ventilator option is unavailable.

In August 2020, Fitbit also announced new smartwatches, the Versa 3, the Inspire 2, and the Fitbit Sense, which includes new health metrics and analysis such as stress sensing, oxygen saturation, and skin temperature. The Sense also promises to show changes in skin temperature to catch signs of sickness.

Certain Sense, Versa, Ionic, and Charge products supported Fitbit Pay, a digital wallet that used NFC to make payments at the point of sale. Google has stated its intention to eventually discontinue this payment method in most regions on July 29, 2024, and fully replace it with Google Wallet & Google Pay. Fitbit Pay remained active in Taiwan, Japan, and Saudi Arabia beyond the set discontinuation date for an unspecified period.

In August 2022, Fitbit announced new smartwatches, the Versa 4, the Inspire 3, and the Sense 2, featuring incremental improvements mainly in fitness tracking features and battery life over the previous iterations.

In 2023, Fitbit released the Charge 6, which added support for Google Maps and YouTube Music.

=== Mobile app ===
Google Health
- Original author: Fitbit LLC
- Developer: Google
- Release: March 21, 2014; 12 years ago

Stable release(s) [±]
- Android: 5.5 (Build 956655267) / July 30, 2026; 3 months ago
- iOS: 5.5.1 / August 8, 2026; 3 months ago
- Operating system: Android 11+, iOS 16+
- Website: www.fitbit.com

In 2026, the Fitbit mobile app was relaunched as Google Health, a name borrowed from a predecessor division and service. As part of the relaunch, the Google Fit app is planned to be folded into the new app by the end of 2026.

== Reception ==
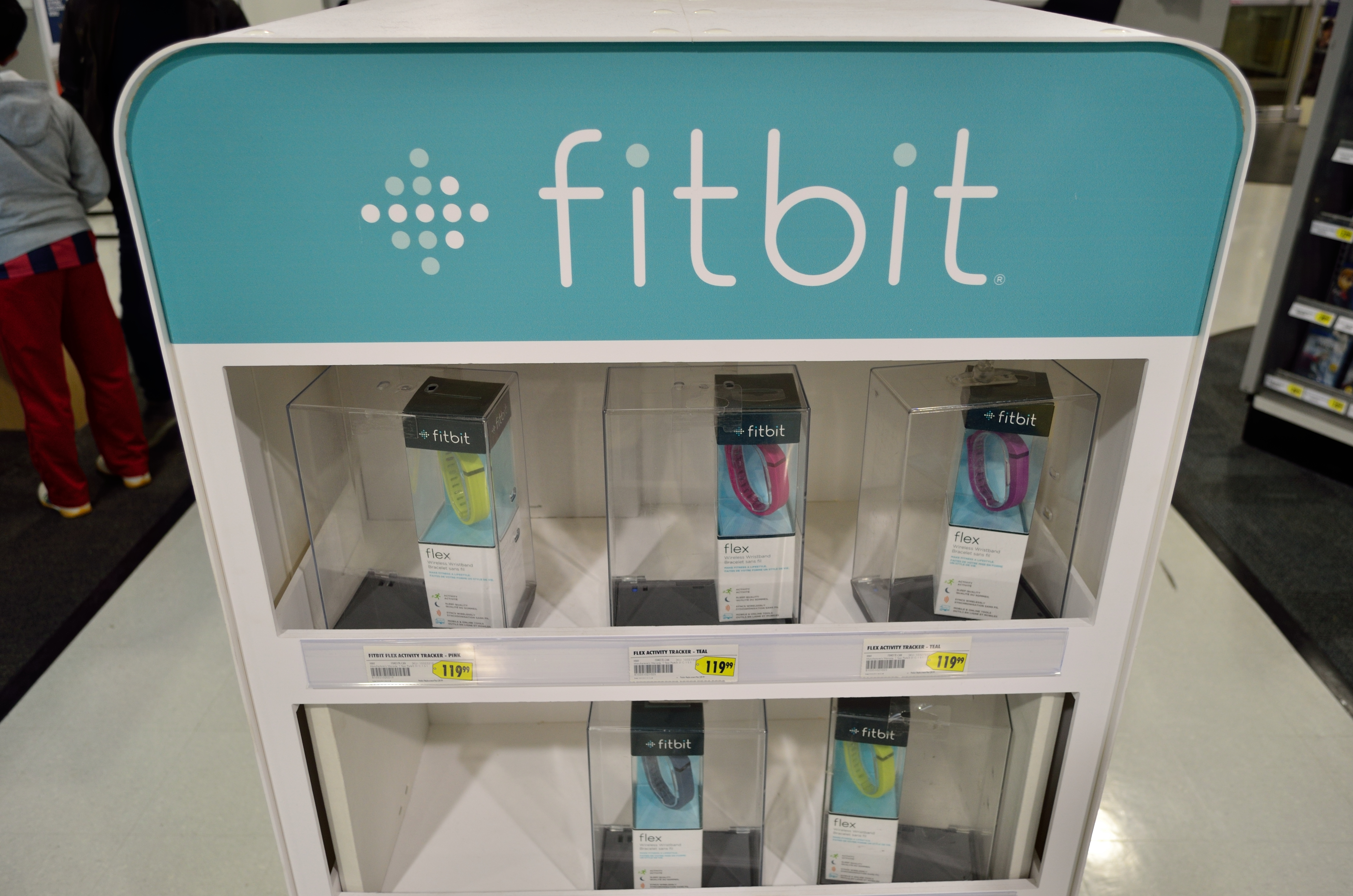
Dedicated Fitbit retail stand stocked with different Fitbit Flex trackers

=== Awards ===
In 2008, Fitbit was named the runner-up at TechCrunch50, and in 2009, it was named both the "Innovation honoree" and "best in the Health & Wellness category" at CES. In 2016, Fitbit ranked 37th of 50 for most innovative companies for that year. Also in 2016, Fitbit was ranked #46 on the Deloitte Fast 500 North America list.

=== Accuracy ===
A small 2015 study had participants wear multiple devices on their wrists and hips while performing different walking/running speeds on a treadmill. Fitbit devices that are worn on the hip accurately measured steps taken within 1 step of 100% accuracy. Devices were worn on the wrist, however, were off by an average of 11 steps per minute. When measuring the number of calories burned, Fitbit devices worn on the hip underestimated by an average of 6%, while devices worn on the wrist overestimated calories burned by 21%. Authors concluded that both the Fitbit One and Fitbit Flex devices reliably measured step counts and energy expenditure, with hip-based Fitbit devices being more accurate than wrist-based devices.

A 2019 study found that the Fitbit Charge 2 accurately measures the average heart rate of healthy adults during sleep, and that it is most accurate for medium range of heart rate. However, the same study found that Fitbit Charge 2 relative to EEG, overestimated sleep efficiency by about 4%, but there was no difference in measured total sleep time.

A 2019 review found that Fitbit devices, which utilize the sleep-staging feature, show a better performance than non-sleep-staging models, especially in differentiating wake from sleep.

== Recalls ==
On February 20, 2014, Fitbit worked with the U.S. Consumer Product Safety Commission (CPSC) to recall the Fitbit Force because some users experienced allergic reactions to the materials used in the product. On March 12, 2014, the CPSC made the recall official. At that time, there were 9,900 reports of skin irritation and 250 reports of blistering.

In April 2017, a woman claimed her Flex 2 device malfunctioned and caught fire, causing second-degree burns on her arm. Following an investigation, Fitbit was adamant that the exploding tracker was caused by external forces, and assured customers that it was not aware of any other complaints and that they could wear their own Fitbits without concern.

During 2018, 2019 and 2020, Fitbit received reports of its Ionic smartwatches overheating, causing second-degree and third-degree burns. On March 2, 2022, Fitbit issued a voluntary recall of 1.7 million Ionic smartwatches, citing overheating issues with the battery posing a burn hazard. At the time of the recall, there were 78 reports of skin burns in the United States and 40 internationally (and 115 reports of overheating in the US and 59 internationally). On January 23, 2025, Fitbit agreed to pay $12.25 million civil penalty for failing to immediately report the burn issue to the CPSC as required by the Consumer Product Safety Act (CPSA).

== Privacy concerns ==
=== Public data-sharing by default ===
To set up and use Fitbit devices, users must create an account with Fitbit and agree to data collection, transfer and privacy rules. Starting in June 2011, Fitbit was criticized for its website's default activity-sharing settings, which made users' manually-entered physical activities available for public viewing. All users had the option to make their physical activity information private, but some users were unaware that the information was public by default. One specific issue, which technology blogs made fun of, was that some users were including details about their sex lives in their daily exercise logs, and this information was, by default, publicly available. Fitbit responded to criticism by making all such data private by default and requesting that search engines remove indexed user profile pages from their databases.

=== Google's acquisition ===
Fitbit's acquisition by Alphabet has resulted in concern that Fitbit user data could be combined with other Google services data or sold for purposes such as targeted advertising. There are also concerns that user data could be sold to health insurance companies. In response, Fitbit stated in 2019 that user data would not be used or sold for advertising by Google, citing that trustworthiness was "paramount" to the company, and that the sale would not change their historic commitment to user privacy and security.

== Use in court cases ==
The company's devices have been used in criminal investigations.

On March 10, 2015, a woman fabricated a story that an intruder appeared in her employer's home in which she was staying and raped her. She told police that a man had assaulted her around midnight. Police found a Fitbit lying on the floor when they arrived at the scene. Prosecutors used the Fitbit as evidence and data to determine what had occurred. The Fitbit revealed that the woman was active throughout the night, and the Fitbit surveillance analysis demonstrated the woman had not gone to bed as she stated to the police, proving that the woman had lied to the police.

In 2017, a Fitbit device played a role in solving the murder of Connie Dabate by her husband, Richard Dabate. Initially, Richard lied to police and law enforcement officials, claiming that an intruder had broken into their home and fatally shot his wife. However, Connie's Fitbit tracker showed that she was at the gym at the time Richard told police his wife was shot. Using Connie's Fitbit and analyzing her movements, analysts created a timeline that disproved Richard's story.

In November 2017, during the disappearance of Tess Richey in Toronto, data information from the Fitbit account Richey shared with her mother was used to track her movements and solve her disappearance, ultimately assisting her mother in locating her remains.

In 2018, Fitbit data was used in the investigation of the homicide of Karen Navarra in San Jose, California. Police accused Navarra's 91-year-old stepfather, Anthony Aiello, of killing her after data from her Fitbit tracker showed a significant spike in her heart rate at about 3:20 p.m., followed by a rapid slowing and the cessation of heart-rate data at 3:28 p.m. Investigators stated that surveillance footage placed Aiello's vehicle at Navarra's home during the relevant period, and Aiello confirmed that he had visited her that afternoon. Aiello was arrested and charged with murder, and was held without bail in Santa Clara County Main Jail. He pleaded not guilty in April 2019 and died in custody in September 2019 while awaiting trial.

== See also ==
- Pebble – Smartwatch
- Quantified self – Movement of people who track themselves with body-related data
- 199 Fremont Street (San Francisco building that formerly housed offices of Fitbit)
