= Katerina Athanasopoulou =

Greek filmmaker

- Born: Katerina Athanasopoulou; Athens, Greece
- Education: Aristotle University of Thessaloniki
- Occupations: Animation artist and Film director
- Years active: 2002–Present
- Spouse: Ian Clark (2006– Present)

Katerina Athanasopoulou (Greek: Κατερίνα Αθανασοπούλου) is a Greek film maker and animation artist.

== Early life ==
Katerina Athanasopoulou was born in Athens and studied painting at the School of Fine Arts of the Aristotle University of Thessaloniki and then completed an MA on animation at the Royal College of Art in London.

== Career ==
Since finishing her MA in 2002 she has directed several short films and provided animation for many more. Her films, which often mix animation and live action, have been seen at festivals around the world. She has been particularly associated with the Clermont-Ferrand International Short Film Festival where seven of her films have been screened and where, in 2007, she was a member of the festival jury.

In 2005 she wrote and directed Sweet Salt for Channel Four's animation series Animate!. The film was broadcast in December 2005 and went on to win several awards.

In 2009 she designed and directed the animation for My blood is my tears, part of the Animated Minds series commissioned by Channel Four.The films focus on young people and their experiences of specific mental health problems. My blood is my tears explores self-harm. The series went on to win a BAFTA Children's Award for Secondary Learning (2009), a Mind Mental Health Media Award (2009), a Royal Television Society Award for Best Educational Television (2009), Scottish Mental Health Arts and Film Award for Best Animation (2009), and Best Educational Film at the Holland Animation Film Festival (2009).

In 2010 she made Engine Angelic; commissioned by Animate Projects. The film has been shown at many exhibitions and galleries including at Paradise Lost, Istanbul Museum of Modern Art, Turkey; Hands on at COLLECT 2011, The Saatchi Gallery, London; Moves - International Festival of Movement on Screen, Liverpool; Animacall, Contemporary Art Center of Thessaloniki; Animfest, Athens; Special Anniversary Screening, Clermont-Ferrand International Short Film Festival; The Thessaloniki Biennale of Contemporary Art. Animate Projects presented Engine Angelic in a programme called Move on Up which was shown at Canary Wharf station during the summer of 2012.

In 2012, she created Apodemy for Visual Dialogues, a group exhibition of multimedia works of art at Plato's Academy Leisure Park, Athens. The film has been shown at a number of festivals, including the Holland Animation Film Festival in Utrecht, the Flatpack Film Festival in Birmingham and at the Shnit international shortfilmfestival in Bern. In October 2013 Apodemy won the Lumen Prize, "an international award that celebrates the very best fine art created digitally." In January 2014 the film was nominated for a British Animation Award.In November 2014 she completed The Violet Hour part of 1914 Now. Four perspectives on fashion curation, a film installation and collaboration between fashion curators and filmmakers. The films were produced for The London College of Fashion‘’ and have been exhibited at Spazio Punch, Venice and at RIBA.

In January 2015, she released Rupture, part of The Art of Saving a Life project, a new initiative by the Bill and Melinda Gates Foundation that brings together more than 30 world-renowned musicians, writers, filmmakers, painters, sculptors and photographers to demonstrate how vaccines continue to positively change the course of history. Rupture focuses on the impact of smallpox in the Franco-Prussian War when the transport of infected French prisoners of war in Prussia, caused a five-year European pandemic, when the infectious disease claimed 500,000 lives. From 11 December 2015 to 29 January 2016 she had a solo exhibition at Project Space Tilburg entitled The Architecture of Melancholy : Ruins.

In March 2016 she contributed a film, Branches of Life, to Body of Songs an album of new music and films based on interpretations of different organs of the body, produced as part of a Wellcome Trust funded project. The singer was Andreya Triana.

In addition to her jury work at Clermont Ferrand she has also been a festival jury member at Platforma Video in Athens (2007) and at the British Animation Awards, London (2012).

== Filmography ==
=== Director ===
- Spoons (2001)
- I Sing the body Electric (2002)
- Argonautica (2002)
- The Clipper (2003)
- Body Remember (2003)
- Sweet Salt (2005)
- My Blood is my Tears (2009)
- Engine Angelic (2010)
- Apodemy (2012)
- Triptych 1 (2013)
- The Violet Hour (2014)
- Rupture (2015)
- Branches of Life (2016)

=== Animator ===
She has contributed animation and special effects to many films. These include:-

- You Never Listen (2005)
- Yesterday, I Think (2006)
- The Age of Stupid (2009)
- The Eight Faces of Jane (2012)

== Exhibitions ==
Exhibitions which have featured her work include: -

=== 2012 ===
- Visual Dialogues, Plato’s Academy Leisure Park, Athens

=== 2014 ===
- 1914 Now: Four Perspectives On Fashion Curating, Venice Biennale of Architecture

=== 2015 ===
- The Architecture of Melancholy : Ruins, SEA Foundation Tilburg, Project Space Tilburg, Netherlands

=== 2017 ===
- 2nd Art Science Technology Festival, 82nd Thessaloniki International Fair, Greece

== Personal life ==
She is married to the English film director Ian Clark and lives in London.
