= List of Fitbit products =

This is a list of products by Fitbit, a line of activity trackers, smartwatches, and other electronic health and fitness devices. Established in 2007 by Fitbit, Inc., the brand was acquired by Google in 2021. This article does not include the Google Pixel Watch.

== Current products ==
=== Activity trackers ===
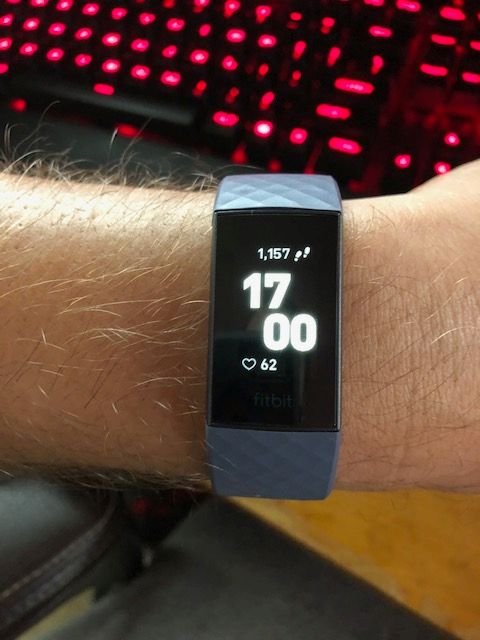
Fitbit Charge 3 displaying time, heart rate, and steps

==== Fitbit Inspire 3 ====
Fitbit's midrange tracker with a 0.76" OLED display and plastic chassis. Announced in August 2022, was released on September 15, 2022.

==== Fitbit Charge 6 ====
Fitbit's premium tracker, with a 1.04" display and mix of features from the Inspire and Sense. Released in September 2023, it supports some smartwatch functionality like Google Maps, YouTube Music, and Google Pay.

==== Fitbit Air ====
Fitbit's entry-level tracker, announced in May 2026. It is screen-less and was released alongside the redesigned Google Health app, with an optional subscription to Google Health Premium for artificial intelligence-powered health insights.

=== Smartwatches ===
==== Fitbit Versa 4 ====
The Fitbit Versa 4 was released on September 23, 2022.

==== Fitbit Sense 2 ====
The Fitbit Sense 2 was released on September 23, 2022.

==== Fitbit Ace LTE ====
In July 2024, Fitbit announced the new Fitbit Ace LTE. Switching from the tracker design of previous Aces to a smartwatch form factor.

=== Smart scales ===
==== Fitbit Aria Air ====
The Fitbit Aria Air smart scale was released in 2019 and priced at $49.95.

== Discontinued products ==
=== Clip-on trackers ===
==== Fitbit Classic ====
The Fitbit Classic was a small black and teal device that could be clipped and worn 24/7. It uses a three-dimensional accelerometer to sense user movement. The Tracker measures steps taken as well as user data to calculate distance walked, calories burned, floors climbed, and activity duration and intensity. It uses an OLED display to display this and other information such as the battery level. It also measures sleep quality by tracking periods of restlessness, how long it takes the wearer to fall asleep and how long they are actually asleep.

A Wireless base station is included to receive data from the Classic and to charge its battery. When connected to a computer, the base station will upload data to the Fitbit website, where a number of features are available: seeing an overview of physical activity, setting and tracking goals, keeping food and activity logs and interacting with friends. Use of the website is free.

The Fitbit Classic tracked only steps taken, distance traveled, calories burned and sleep.

At the TechCrunch50 during the "Mobile" session on September 9, 2008, Fitbit received positive reactions during its panel from experts like Rafe Needleman, Tim O'Reilly, and Evan Williams who cited its wearability, price, and lack of subscription fees.

==== Fitbit Ultra ====
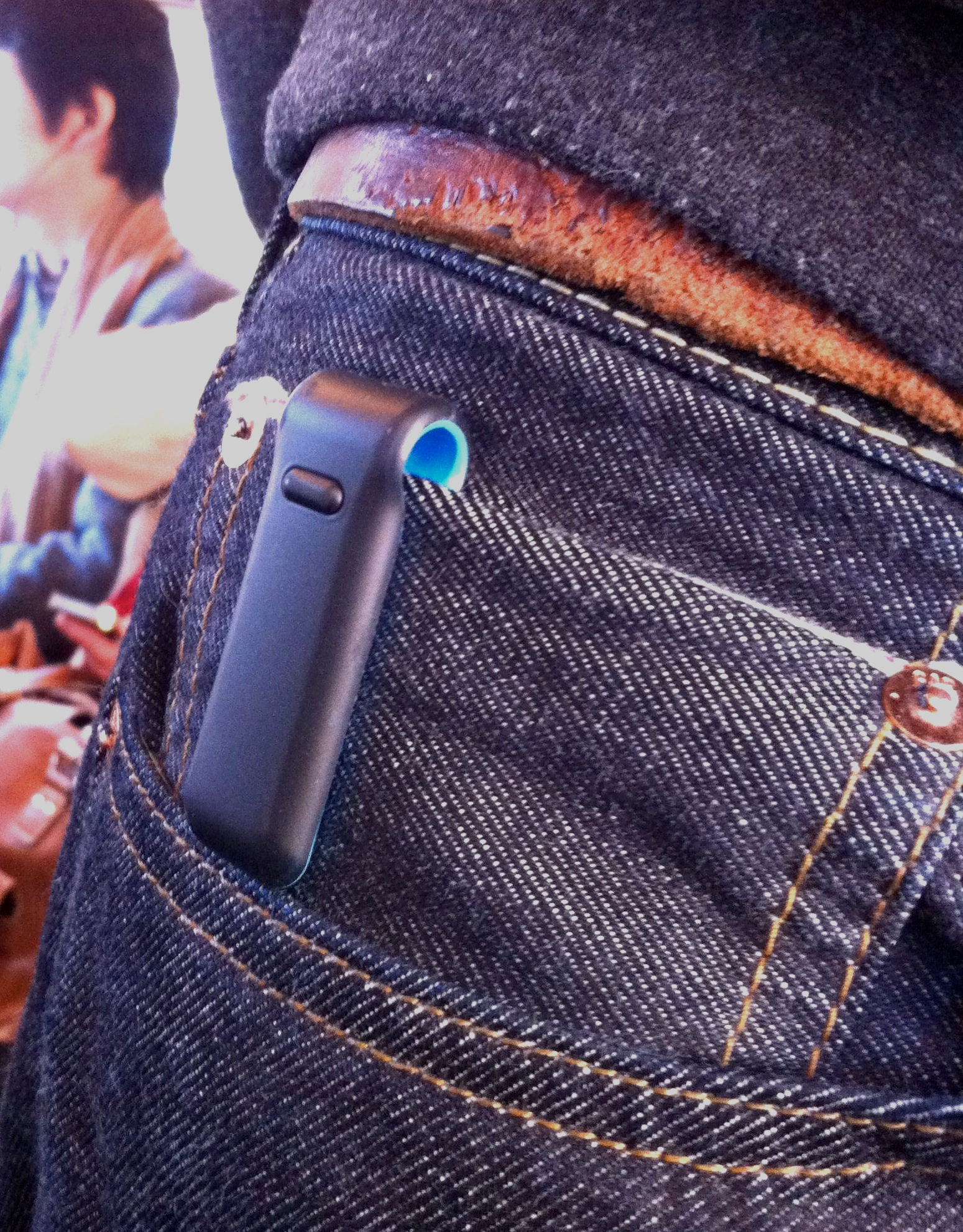
Fitbit Ultra activity tracker in teal clipped to pocket

The Fitbit Ultra was announced on October 3, 2011. The new features included:

- an altimeter that measures elevation gain in terms of floors, with one floor roughly equivalent to ten feet
- a digital clock visible on the device's display
- a stopwatch that can be used to time activities
- randomized "Chatter" messages show when the Ultra is moved after sitting idle for a while
- new colors

The Fitbit Ultra is powered by a small lithium polymer battery.

The Fitbit Ultra suffered from a small design flaw: the unit had a permanently curved shape in order to clip directly onto any piece of clothing. The plastic used in the unit was inappropriate for the strain experienced at the looped end, and with time would become brittle, and crack. While most users experienced only minor cracking with no effects on the device's function, in a few cases the cracking led to total failure. Fitbit offered replacement or repair of affected units that were under warranty.

==== Fitbit One ====
Announced on September 17, 2012, the Fitbit One is an update to the Fitbit Ultra that has a more vivid digital display, a separate clip and a separate charging cable and wireless sync dongle. The Fitbit One and the Fitbit Zip were the first wireless activity trackers to sync using Bluetooth 4.0 or Bluetooth Low Energy technology. Wireless syncing is currently available on iOS and Android devices such as the iPhone 4S and higher, iPad 3rd generation, iPod touch 5th generation, Samsung Galaxy Note II and higher, Samsung Galaxy S III and higher, LG G2, HTC One, Moto X, and Nexus 4 or higher. Fitbit One can record several daily activities, including but not limited to, the number of steps taken, distance travelled on foot, the number of floors climbed, calories burned, and sleep efficiency, and the time.

==== Fitbit Zip ====
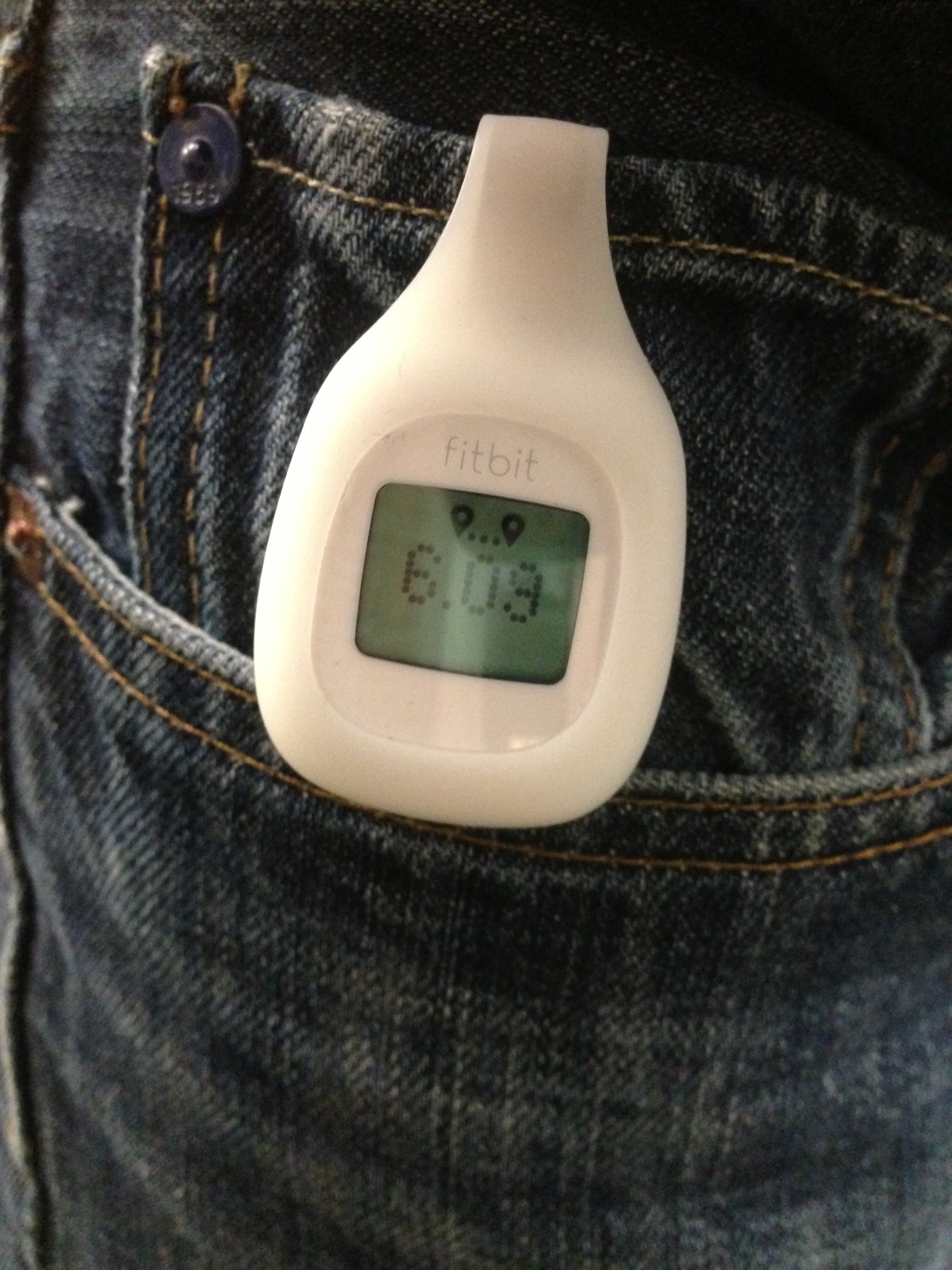
A white Fitbit Zip, showing the distance in miles covered by the wearer

Announced on September 17, 2012, the Fitbit Zip is about the size of a United States quarter and tracks steps taken, distance traveled and calories burned. It is able to sync its data wirelessly to supported mobile devices. Notably, it showed faces based on how much activity the wearer was showing. If the wearer had little to no activity, it would stick its tongue out, but if they had sufficient activity, it would show a smiley face. The Zip, however, could not track sleep.

The Fitbit Zip was discontinued and replaced with the Fitbit Inspire clip accessory in March 2019.

=== Wristband trackers ===
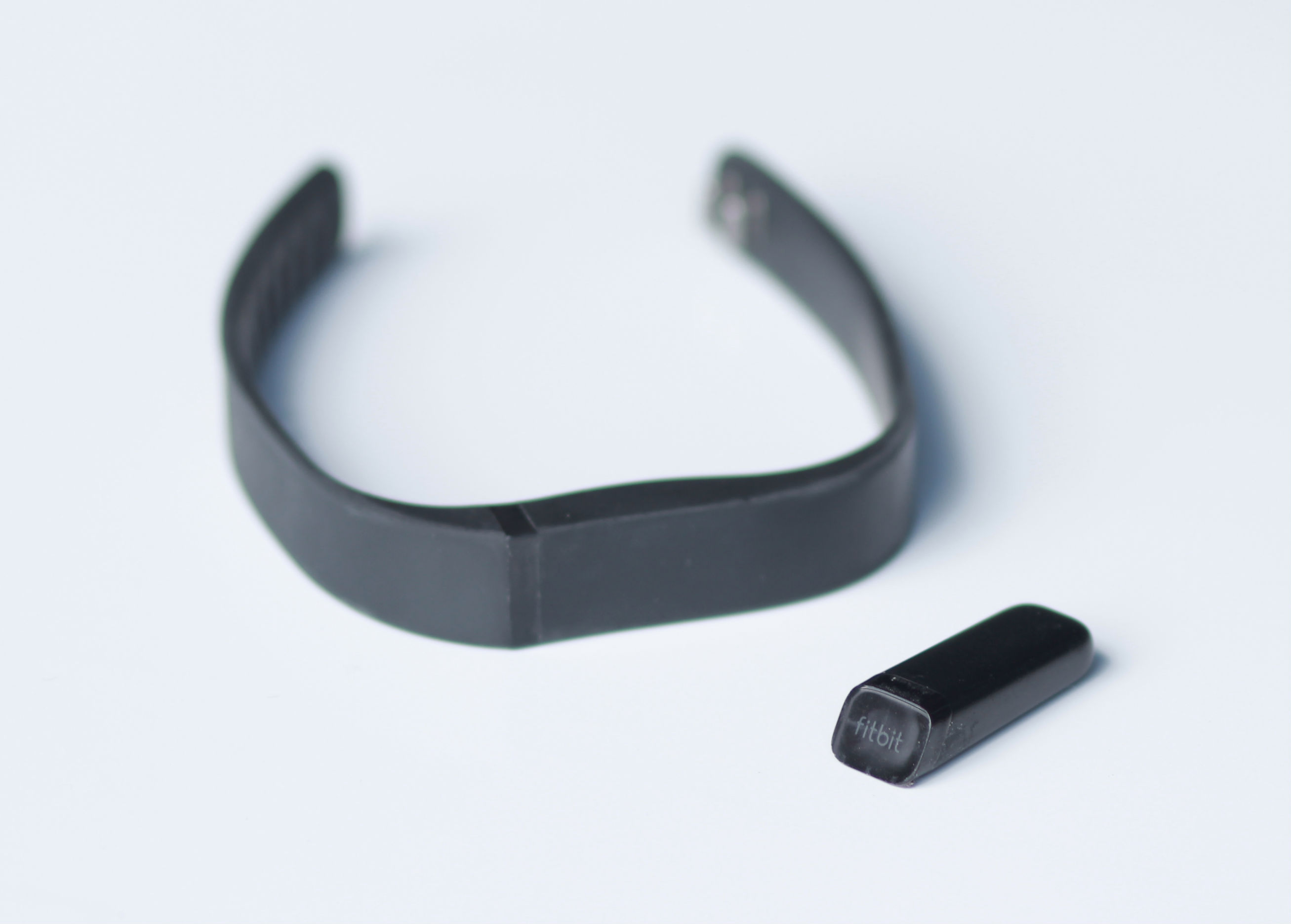
Fitbit Flex with accompanying wristband

==== Fitbit Flex ====
In May 2013, Fitbit released the Fitbit Flex, the first Fitbit tracker worn on the wrist. It tracks movement 24 hours a day, including sleep patterns. It has a simple display of 5 LED lights that indicate the progress toward the goal number of steps walked in a day and vibrates to indicate when the goal has been reached. The sync functions are similar to the Fitbit One and Zip. The Flex is a water-resistant tracker, though unlike its successor the Flex 2, cannot be worn while swimming. It includes a specialized USB charger; the battery lasts 5–7 days, and it takes 1–2 hours to charge.

==== Fitbit Flex 2 ====
Released in 2016. It is waterproof and can track swimming. The tracker can be worn in a wristband or pendant or carried in a pocket. The LED lights function similarly to the original Flex, with the number of illuminated dots indicating progress toward the set goal. It features "reminder to move" alerts and vibrations when a call or text is received. It also features accessories such as bangles and pendants. Replaced by the Inspire line.

==== Fitbit Force ====
The Fitbit Force was announced on October 10, 2013. It has an OLED display that shows time and daily activity. The Force tracks the number of statistics in real-time, including steps taken, distance travelled, calories burned, stairs climbed and active minutes throughout the day. At night, the Force tracks sleep and can wake a user silently with a vibrating alarm.

On January 13, 2014, it was reported that an unconfirmed number of Fitbit customers had complained about skin irritation after wearing the Force for extended periods of time. Fitbit stated on its website that the company consulted with medical professionals whose assessments are that these irritations are most likely allergic reactions to nickel, a component of the surgical-grade steel or the adhesives used to assemble the Fitbit Force. Fitbit, working with the Consumer Protection Safety Commission, recalled the Fitbit Force on February 20, 2014. On March 12, 2014 the Consumer Product Safety Commission (CPSC) made the recall official. At that time it was revealed that The Fitbit Force had caused about 9,900 injuries. It is no longer for sale on Fitbit's website.

==== Fitbit Charge ====
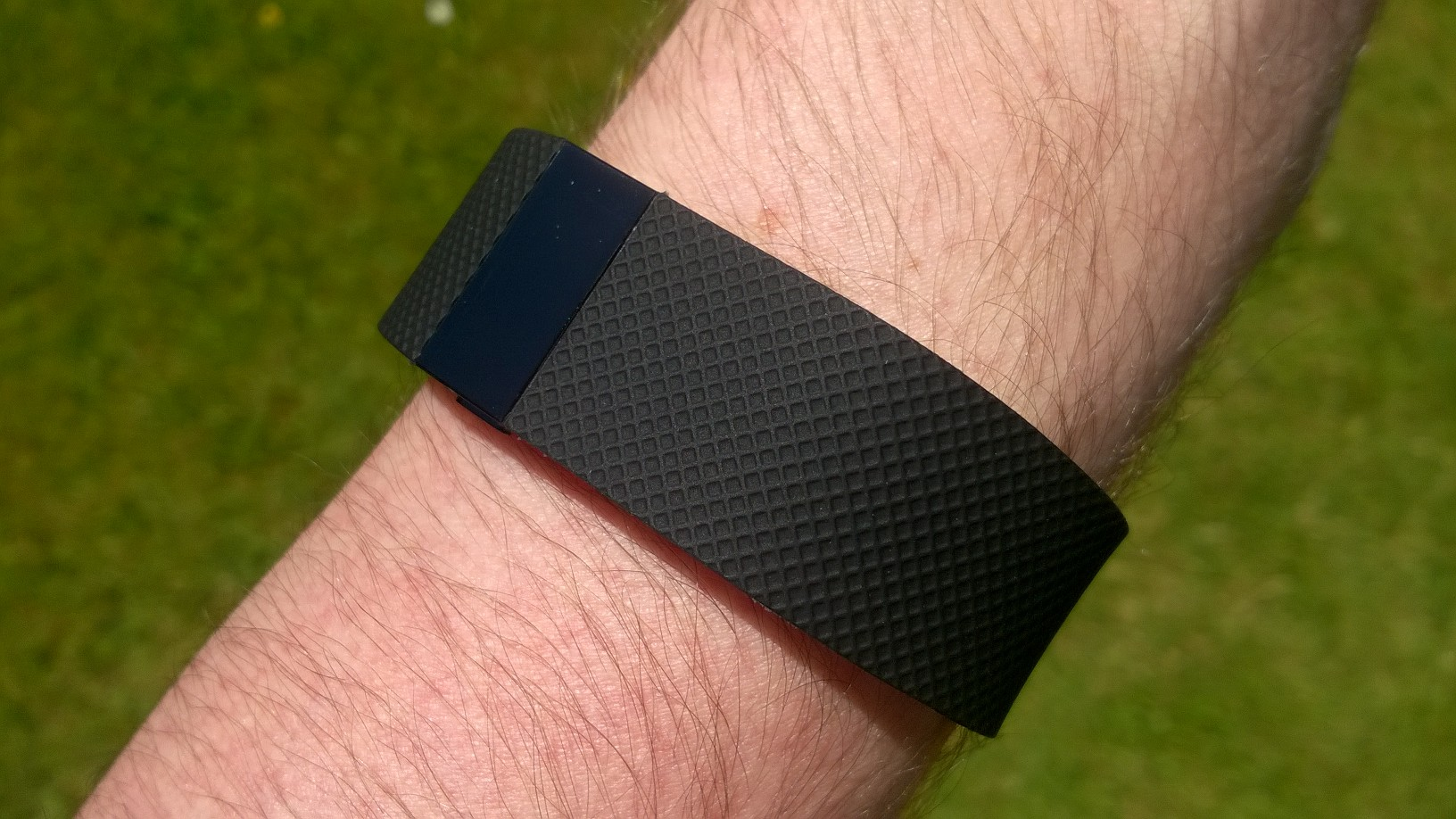
Fitbit Charge HR

Announced in October 2014, the Fitbit Charge is intended as a replacement for the recalled Fitbit Force. It was released in November 2014 for US$130 retail. The Charge's wristband is textured. The Charge automatically tracks users' steps, sleep, flights of stairs, and an approximation of the distance travelled. It tracks steps using a 3-axis accelerometer by tracking forward movement along with upward movements.

==== Fitbit Charge HR ====
Announced in October 2014 and released in early January 2015, the Charge HR is similar to the Charge, with an additional heart-rate monitor. With this addition, the 7-day battery life is reduced to 5 days. The Charge HR has the same textured band as the Charge and comes in black, plum, blue, tangerine, pink, and teal colors. The Charge HR band clasp resembles that of a traditional watch instead of the snap-on band of the original Charge, as the band needs to fit tightly for the heart rate feature.

==== Fitbit Charge 3 ====
The Fitbit Charge 3 was released in October 2018. It has a heart rate sensor as well as an oxygen saturation (SPO2) sensor - however, it shipped non-functional but Fitbit eventually enabled the feature. Sleep tracking has been improved from the Charge 2. In November 2018, a special edition of the Fitbit Charge 3 was released featuring "Fitbit Pay" as a special feature. First of the "Charge" line to be swimproof.

==== Fitbit Charge 4 ====
The Fitbit Charge 4 is a tracker released in March 2020. It shares the same form factor as the Charge 3, but includes additional features such as in-built Spotify controls, Active Zone Minutes and Fitbit Pay Support. Charge 4 also has built in GPS, and many of the Charge 3 clock faces return.

==== Fitbit Alta ====
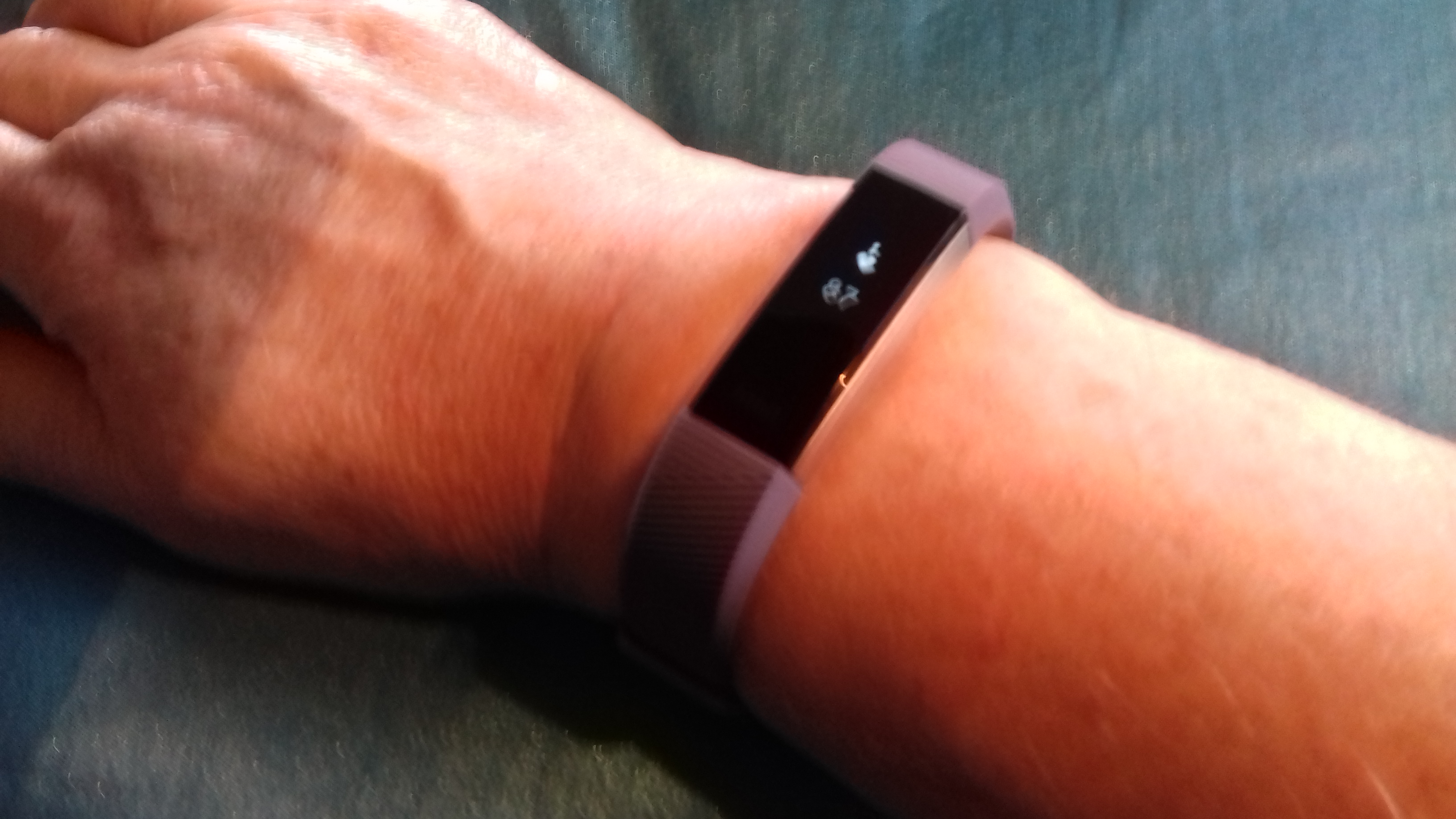
Fitbit Alta HR fitness tracker wristband showing heart rate monitor display

The Fitbit Alta was released in February 2016. The wristband offers a full OLED screen that can be tapped for reminders, a clock and smartphone notifications. While not a touch screen, it is interacted with by tapping the band, similar to previous models. The Alta is also able to recognize the type of activity in progress: running, football, or walking. The Fitbit Alta and Fitbit Alta HR were discontinued and replaced by the Fitbit Inspire line.

==== Fitbit Charge 5 ====
The Fitbit Charge 5 is a tracker released in September 2021.

==== Fitbit Luxe ====
Fitbit Luxe is an advanced "early Google-Fitbit" fitness band designed to act as a piece of jewelry, released on 30 April 2021.

==== Fitbit Ace range ====
Launched in March 2018, the Fitbit Ace is essentially a version of the Alta for children aged 8 and above. In March 2019, the Fitbit Ace 2 for kids aged 6 to 12 was announced. In March 2021, the Fitbit Ace 3 was released, adding a curvier appearance, also for ages 6–12.

=== Smartwatches ===
==== Fitbit Surge ====
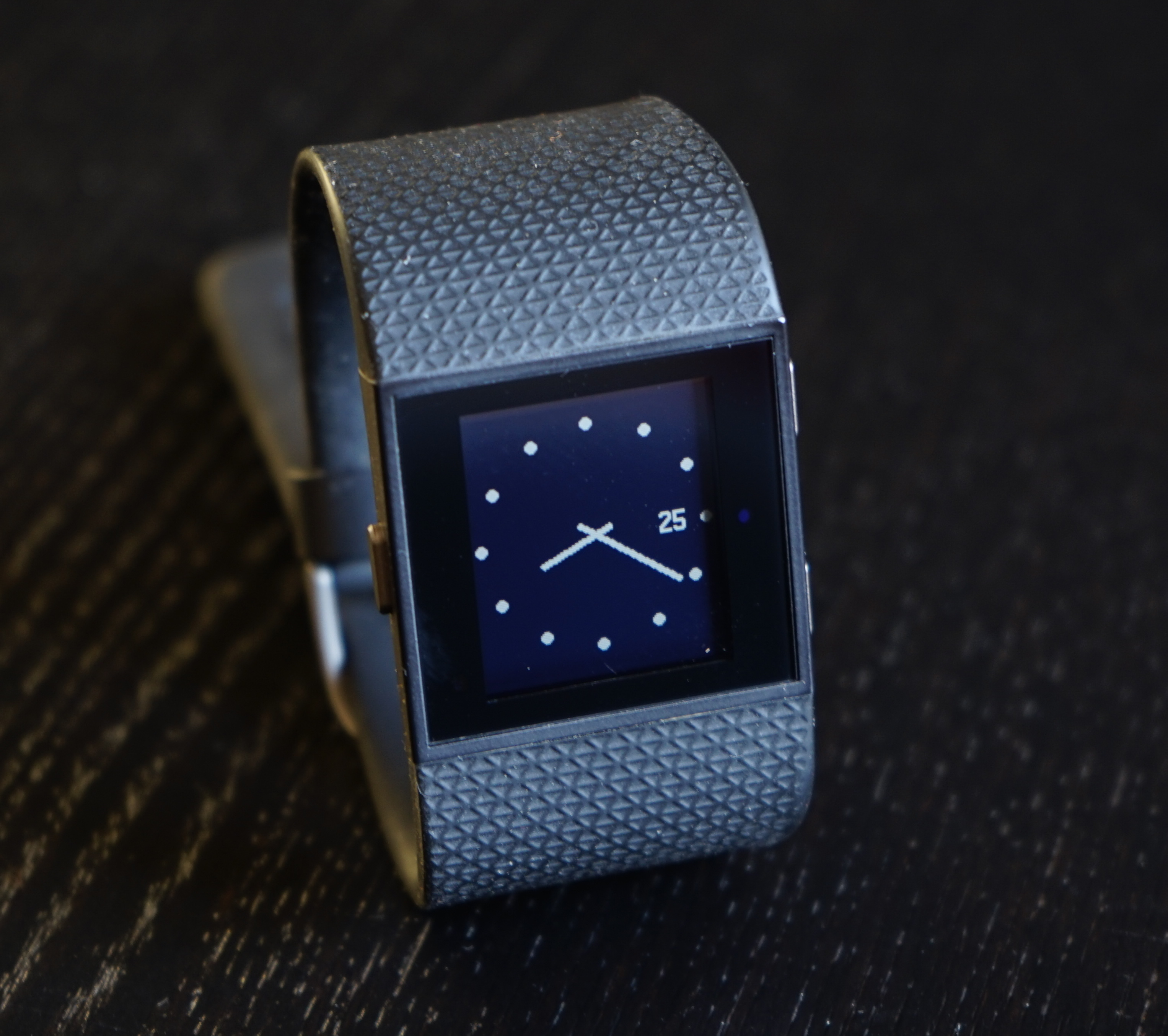
Fitbit Surge

Announced in October 2014, the Surge was a smart watch and an activity tracker. It features a heart-rate monitor and the ability to track pace, distance, and elevation using the GPS on the device. The Surge also can send alerts of text and incoming calls from a connected smartphone.

The Surge was discontinued in late 2017 and was replaced by the Ionic.

==== Fitbit Blaze ====
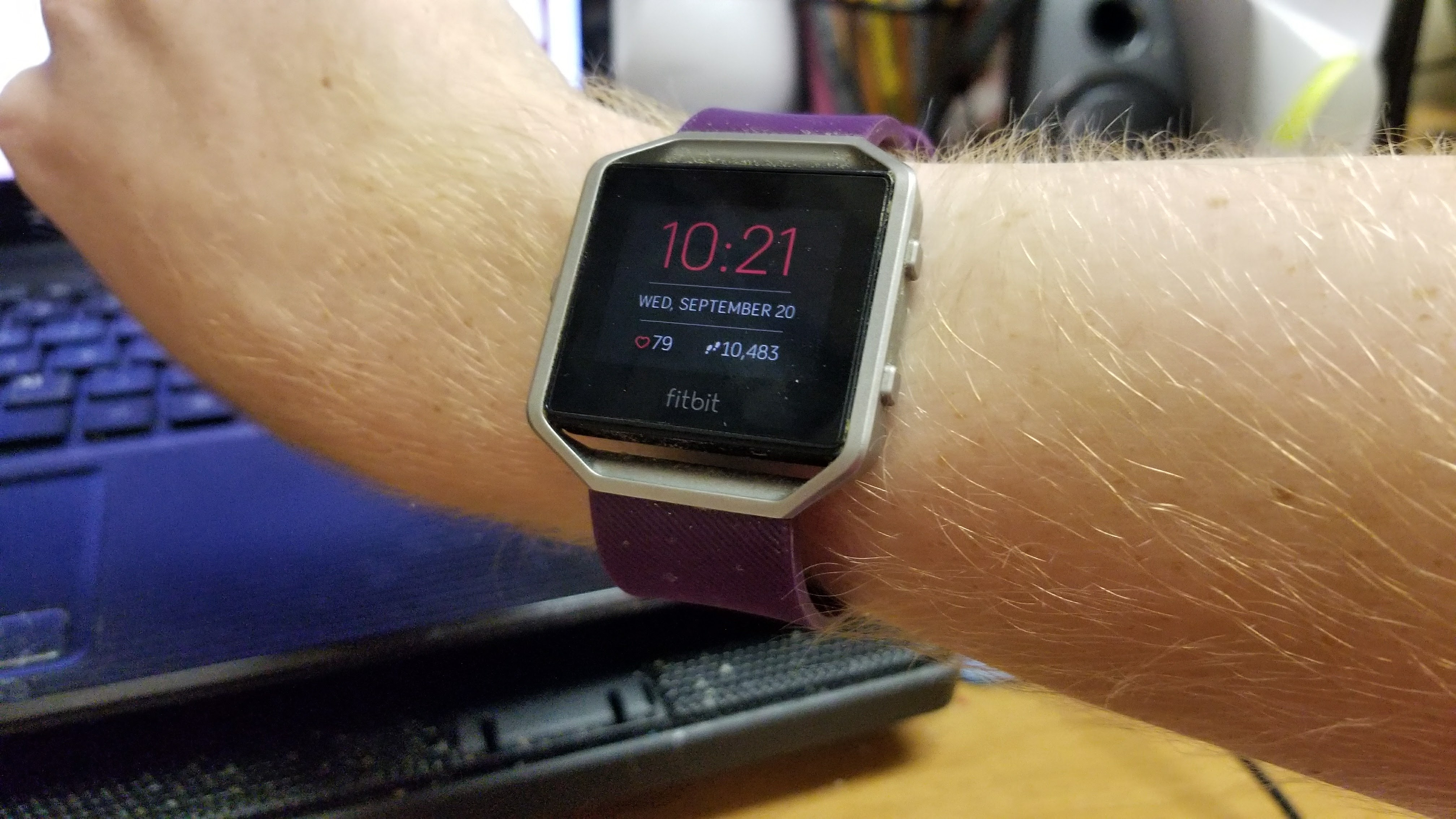
Fitbit Blaze

Released in January 2016 the Fitbit Blaze is a smartwatch made to compete with the Apple Watch, Pebble, and Android Wear. The Blaze comes with a coloured touchscreen, and an exchangeable strap and frame. It can auto-track exercises and has a heart-rate monitor. Blaze has connected GPS, meaning it tracks location using the connected smartphone's GPS. It can display notifications, including incoming calls, texts and calendar appointments. The Blaze introduces the Sleep Stages feature.

The Fitbit Blaze also integrates with Fitstar, Fitbit's website for customized workouts. These workouts can be displayed on the Blaze's screen.

The Blaze was discontinued in early 2018 and was replaced by the Versa.

==== Fitbit Ionic ====
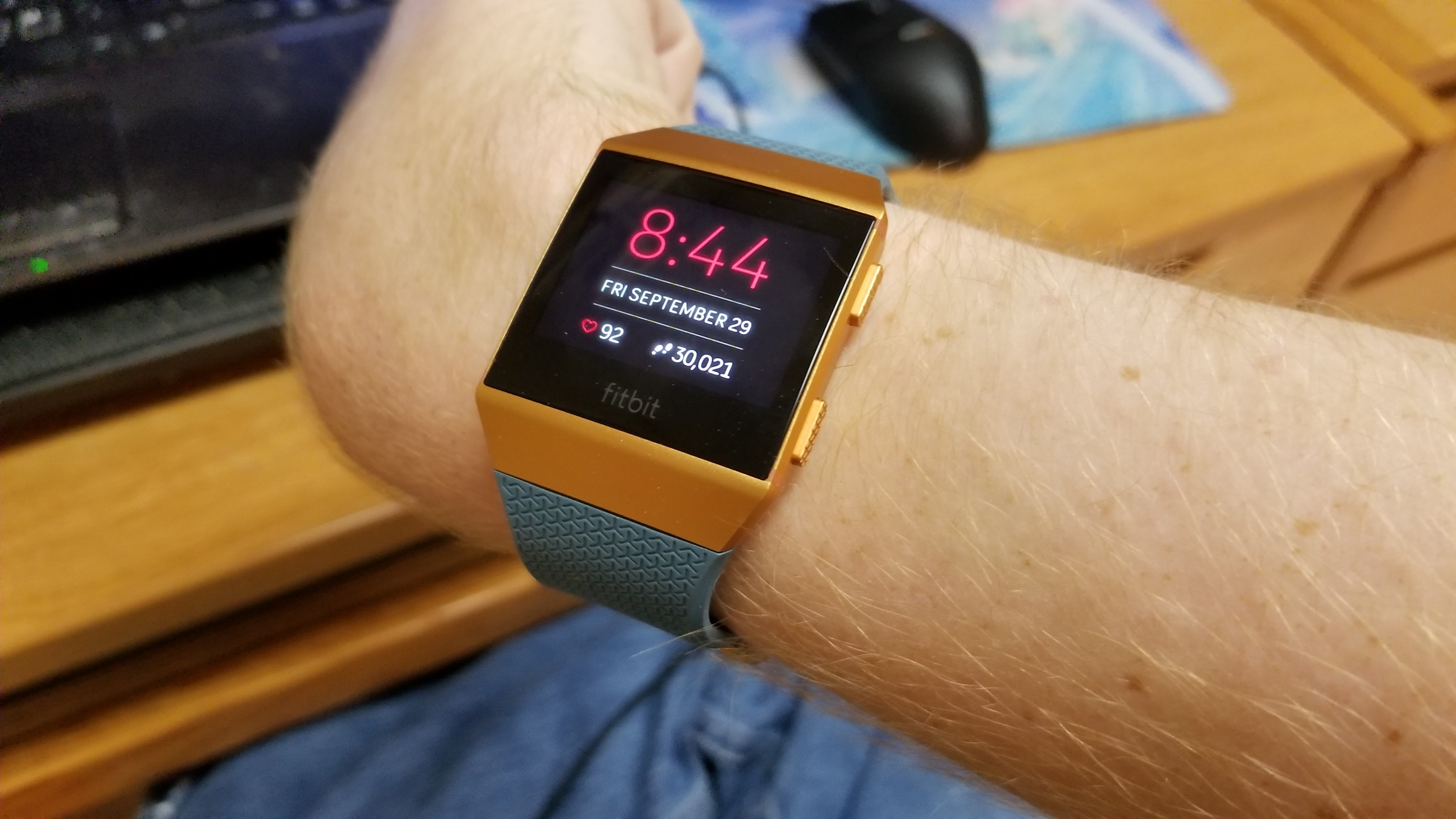
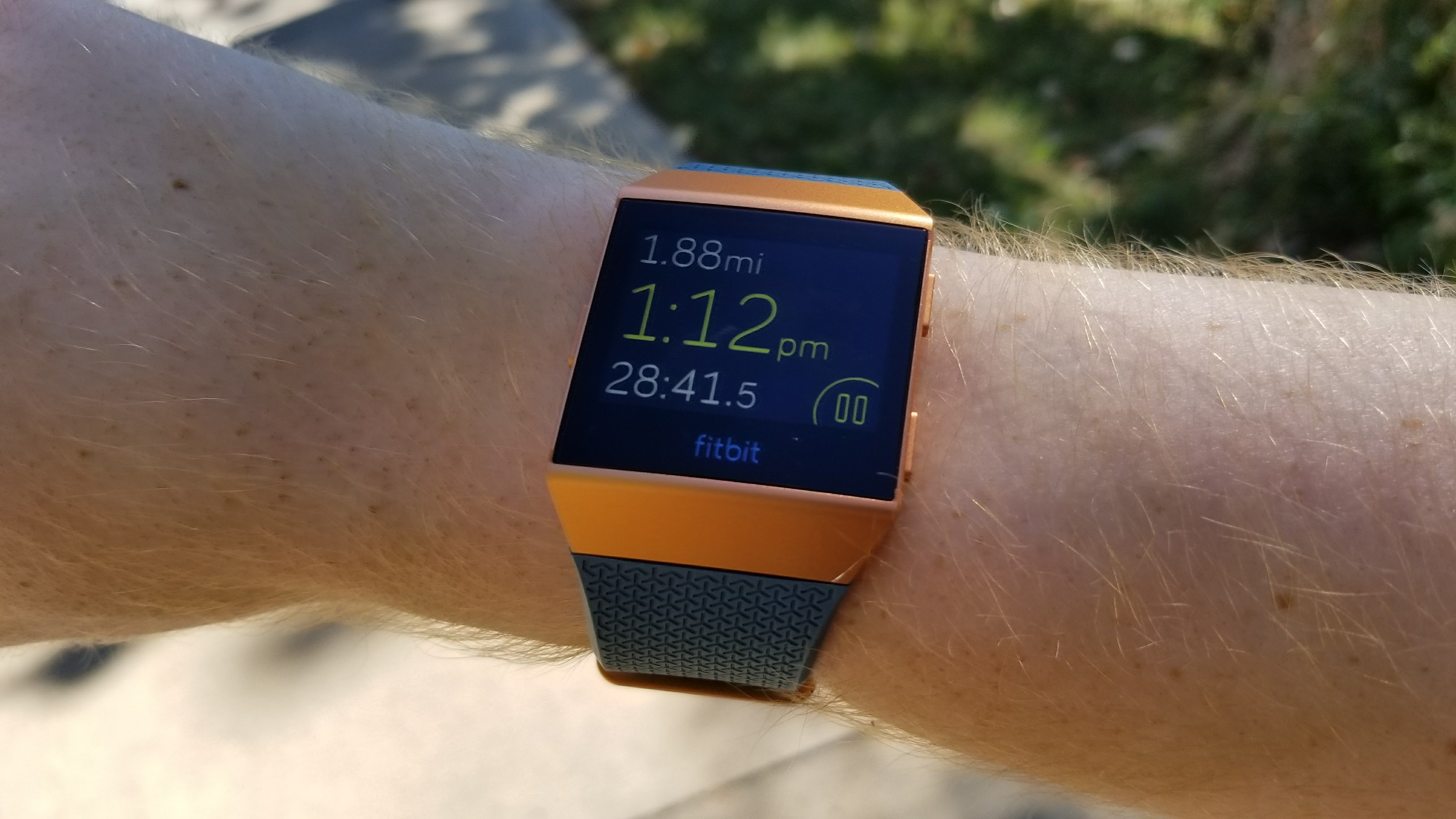
Fitbit Ionic

The Fitbit Ionic was released in late September 2017. Designed to compete with the Apple Watch Series 3, it is the successor to both the Blaze and the Surge. Like the Surge, the Ionic uses built-in GPS, using GLONASS to tap into global satellites and provide better accuracy when recording exercises, with the antenna being integrated into the watch case for a stronger connection. The Ionic also features SmartTrack, which auto-recognizes user activity and records it in the Fitbit app. The Ionic has interchangeable bands, including classic Fitbit bands, leather bands, and perforated bands for a more sport-like appearance, and the release mechanism has been modified to make swapping out bands easier. It is also water-resistant, making it safe to wear when swimming. Many of the Blaze's clock faces return, as do several new clock faces. New to the Ionic is the ability to load apps onto the watch itself such as AccuWeather and Starbucks, as well as an NFC chip that allows the Ionic to be used for credit card purchases at places that allow contactless payment. As a result, the tactile buttons on the Ionic have some new functions. When not in workout mode, the right side buttons now function as shortcuts for the leftmost two apps loaded onto the watch, while a long press on the left side button brings up Fitbit Pay as well as music and quick settings. The Ionic is shipped in three color combinations of the wristband and watch case: Charcoal & Smoke Gray, Slate Blue & Burnt Orange, and Blue Gray & Silver Gray.

In 2018, the Ionic was updated to Fitbit OS 2.0 alongside the release of the Versa. The most notable change from OS 1.0 is the addition of a new app called Fitbit Today, a dashboard displaying the user's health and fitness data. In July 2018, Fitbit announced the 15+ Best Fitbit OS Apps for Travel, which can be downloaded in Ionic and some are also available in Versa.

On March 2, 2022, Fitbit announced a recall for the Ionic units due to a burn hazard risk.

==== Fitbit Versa ====
Released in April 2018, it has a square design with round edges, similar to the Apple Watch and Pebble watches. It retains most of the Ionic's features and interface. It is capable of tracking women's menstrual cycles. It does not have built-in GPS like the Ionic, instead using connected GPS like the Blaze.

There are three variants of the Versa; the standard edition, the Special Edition, and the Lite Edition. The standard Versa comes in three colors: black, rose gold, or silver. The Special Edition comes in rose gold with a lavender band, or graphite with a charcoal band. The Special Edition also includes woven wristbands. In the United States, the Special Edition of the Versa is the only version of the watch to ship with Fitbit Pay. The Lite Edition has a more limited feature set and comes in silver with a white or lilac band, marina blue, or mulberry.

==== Fitbit Versa 2 ====
The Fitbit Versa 2 was released in September 2019 and was priced at $199.95.

==== Fitbit Versa 3 ====
The Fitbit Versa 3 was announced in August 2020 and released at the end of September 2020.

==== Fitbit Sense ====
The Fitbit Sense was released at the end of September 2020. The Sense received FDA-approval for its electrocardiogram function. This function was available in select regions only at launch. This model features stress tracking, as well as blood oxygen measurements. Similar to the Fitbit Versa 3, this Fitbit also removes the ability to store music on the device, as available in the Fitbit Versa 2.

=== Smart scales ===
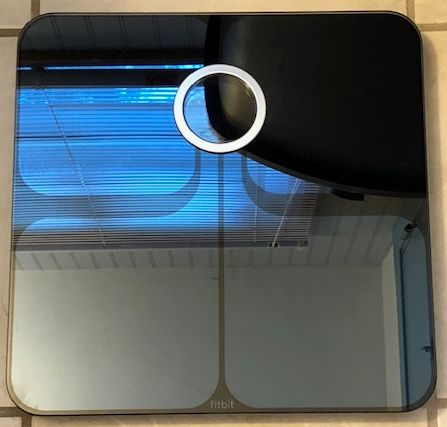
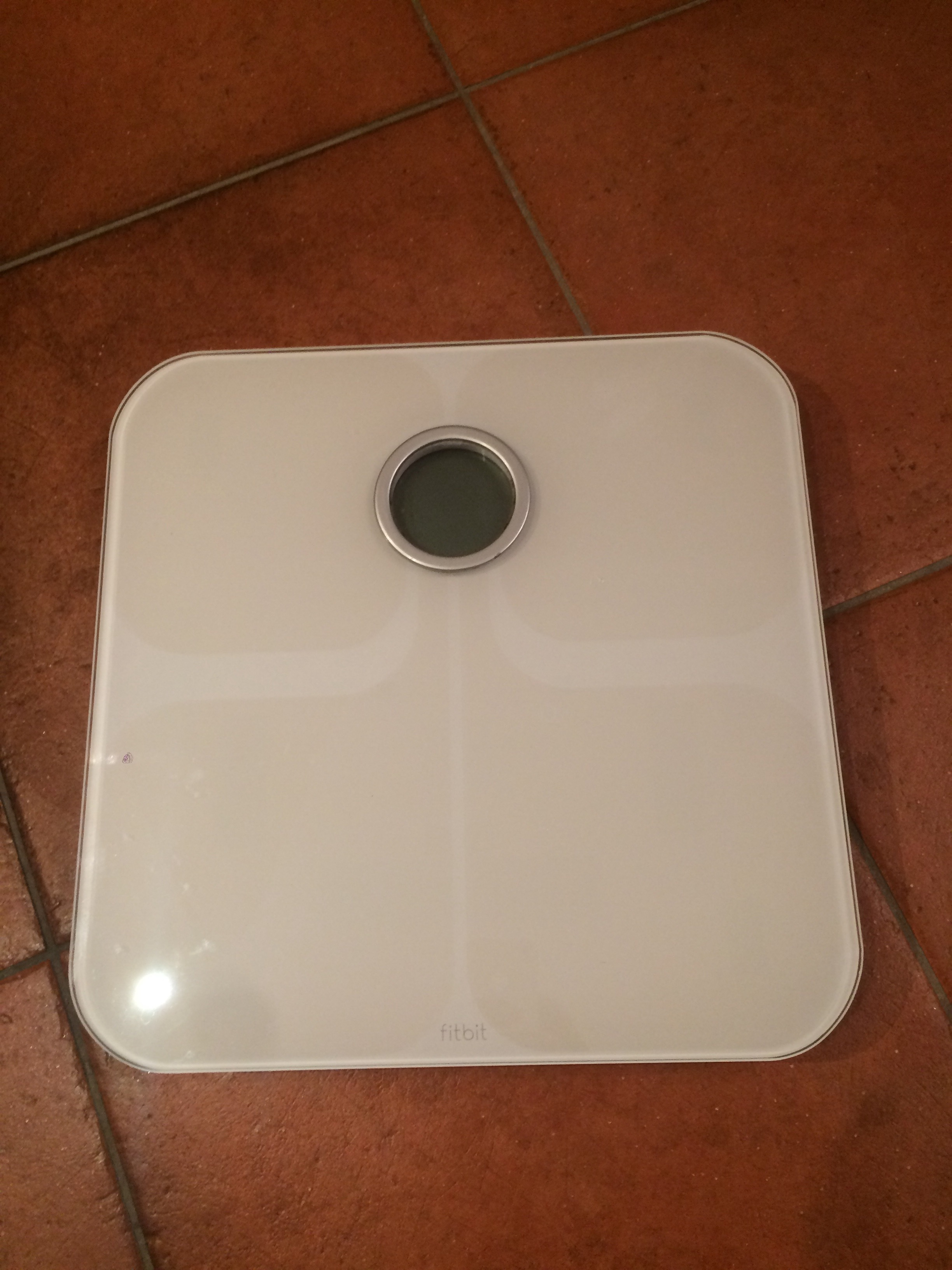
Fitbit Aria scales

==== Fitbit Aria ====
In April 2012, Fitbit released a weighing scale called the Fitbit Aria. It recognizes users and measures weight, body mass index (BMI) and percentage of body fat of the user. It can keep track of eight individual users and updates information to fitbit.com automatically via Wi-Fi network. The information is also updated to smartphone apps.

=== Wireless headphones ===
==== Fitbit Flyer ====
Sweatproof wireless earphones by Fitbit. Has noise isolation.

== Fitbit comparison (2007–2026) ==
Please note this list does not include the Pixel Watch series of smartwatches.

Model	Type	Released	Steps	Floors	Heart rate	Oxygen	Skin Temp	Sleep	Sleep stages	Clock	Swim	GPS	Stress tracking	ECG	Fitbit OS	Water resistance	Battery life	AOD	Customizable appearance
Classic	Clip	2009	Yes	No	No	No	No	Yes	No	No	No	No	No	No	No	Resistant	7 days	No	No
Ultra	Clip	2011	Yes	Yes	No	No	No	Yes	No	Yes	No	No	No	No	No	Resistant	7 days	No	No
One	Clip	2012	Yes	Yes	No	No	No	Yes	No	Yes	No	No	No	No	No	Resistant	10–14 days	No	Yes
Zip	Clip	2012	Yes	No	No	No	No	No	No	Yes	No	No	No	No	No	Resistant	4–6 months	No	Yes
Flex	Wristband	2013	Yes	No	No	No	No	Yes	No	No	No	No	No	No	No	10 m (33 ft)	5 days	No	Yes
Force	Wristband	2013	Yes	Yes	No	No	No	Yes	No	Yes	No	No	No	No	No	Resistant	7–10 days	No	No
Charge	Wristband	2014	Yes	Yes	No	No	No	Yes	No	Yes	No	No	No	No	No	Resistant	7–10 days	No	No
Charge HR	Wristband	2015	Yes	Yes	Yes	No	No	Yes	No	Yes	No	No	No	No	No	Resistant	5 days	No	Yes
Surge	Smart watch	2015	Yes	Yes	Yes	No	No	Yes	No	Yes	No	Built-in GPS	No	No	No	Resistant	7 days	No	No
Blaze	Smart watch	2016	Yes	Yes	Yes	No	No	Yes	Yes	Yes	No	Uses smartphone's GPS	No	No	No	Resistant	5 days	No	Yes
Alta	Wristband	2016	Yes	No	No	No	No	Yes	No	Yes	No	No	No	No	No	Resistant	5 days	No	Yes
Charge 2	Wristband	2016	Yes	Yes	Yes	No	No	Yes	Yes	Yes	No	Uses smartphone's GPS	No	No	No	Resistant	5 days	No	Yes
Flex 2	Wristband, bangle or pendant	2016	Yes	No	No	No	No	Yes	Yes	No	Yes	No	No	No	No	Waterproof, 50 m (160 ft)	5 days	No	Yes
Alta HR	Wristband	2017	Yes	No	Yes	No	No	Yes	Yes	Yes	No	No	No	No	No	Resistant	5–7 days	No	Yes
Ionic	Smart watch	2017	Yes	Yes	Yes	Yes	Maybe	Yes	Yes	Yes	Yes	Built-in GPS	No	No	Yes	Waterproof, 50 m (160 ft)	4–5 days	No	Yes
Versa	Smart watch	2018	Yes	Yes	Yes	Yes	Maybe	Yes	Yes	Yes	Yes	Uses smartphone's GPS	No	No	Yes	Waterproof, 50 m (160 ft)	4 days	No	Yes
Ace	Wristband	2018	Yes	Yes	No	No	No	Yes	No	Yes	No	Uses smartphone's GPS	No	No	No	Resistant	5 days	No	Yes
Charge 3	Wristband	2018	Yes	Yes	Yes	Yes	No	Yes	Yes	Yes	Yes	Uses smartphone's GPS	No	No	No	Waterproof, 50 m (160 ft)	7 days	No	Yes
Inspire	Wristband	2019	Yes	No	No	No	No	Yes	No	Yes	Yes	Uses smartphone's GPS	No	No	No	Waterproof, 50 m (160 ft)	5 days	No	Yes
Inspire HR	Wristband	2019	Yes	No	Yes	No	No	Yes	Yes	Yes	Yes	Uses smartphone's GPS	No	No	No	Waterproof, 50 m (160 ft)	5 days	No	Yes
Ace 2	Wristband	2019	Yes	No	No	No	No	Yes	Yes	Yes	No	Uses smartphone's GPS	No	No	No	Waterproof, 50 m (160 ft)	5 days	No	Yes
Versa 2	Smart watch	2019	Yes	Yes	Yes	Yes	Maybe	Yes	Yes	Yes	Yes	Uses smartphone's GPS	No	No	Yes	Waterproof, 50 m (160 ft)	4 days	No	Yes
Versa Lite Edition	Smart watch	2019	Yes	No	Yes	Yes	Maybe	Yes	Yes	Yes	Yes	Uses smartphone's GPS	No	No	Yes	Waterproof, 50 m (160 ft)	4 days	No	Yes
Charge 4	Wristband	2020	Yes	Yes	Yes	Yes	Maybe	Yes	Yes	Yes	Yes	Built-in and smartphone GPS	No	No	Yes	Waterproof, 50 m (160 ft)	3 hours (GPS); 7 days (advertised)	No	Yes
Versa 3	Smart watch	2020	Yes	Yes	Yes	Yes	Maybe	Yes	Yes	Yes	Yes	Built-in and smartphone GPS	No	No	Yes	Waterproof, 50 m (160 ft)	TBD (GPS); 6 days (advertised); Fast charge one extra day in 12 minutes	Yes	Yes
Sense	Smart watch	2020	Yes	Yes	Yes	Yes	Yes	Yes	Yes	Yes	Yes	Built-in and smartphone GPS	Yes	Yes	Yes	Waterproof, 50 m (160 ft)	TBD (GPS); 6+ days (advertised); Fast charge one extra day in 12 minutes Full charge in 1–2 hours (manufacturer's claim)	Yes	Yes
Inspire 2	Wristband or clip	2020	Yes	No	Yes	No	Maybe	Yes	Yes	Yes	Yes	Uses smartphone's GPS	No	No	Yes	Waterproof, 50 m (160 ft)	10 days	No	Yes
Ace 3	Wristband	2021	Yes	No	No	No	No	Yes	Yes	Yes	No	Uses smartphone's GPS	No	No	No	Waterproof, 50 m (160 ft)	8 days	No	Yes
Luxe	Wristband	2021	Yes	No	Yes	Yes	Maybe	Yes	Yes	Yes	Yes	Uses smartphone's GPS	No	No	Yes	Waterproof, 50 m (160 ft)	5 days	Yes	Yes
Charge 5	Wristband	2021	Yes	No	Yes	Yes	Maybe	Yes	Yes	Yes	Yes	Built-in and smartphone GPS	Yes	Yes	Yes	Waterproof, 50 m (160 ft)	7 days	Yes	Yes
Inspire 3	Wristband or clip	2022	Yes	No	Yes	Yes	Maybe	Yes	Yes	Yes	Yes	Uses smartphone's GPS	Yes	No	Yes	Waterproof, 50 m (160 ft)	10 days	Yes	Yes
Versa 4	Smart watch	2022	Yes	Yes	Yes	Yes	Maybe	Yes	Yes	Yes	Yes	Built-in and smartphone GPS	Yes	No	Yes	Waterproof, 50 m (160 ft)	TBD (GPS); 6 days (advertised); Fast charge one extra day in 12 minutes	Yes	Yes
Sense 2	Smart watch	2022	Yes	Yes	Yes	Yes	Yes	Yes	Yes	Yes	Yes	Built-in and smartphone GPS	Yes	Yes	Yes	Waterproof, 50 m (160 ft)	TBD (GPS); 6+ days (advertised); Fast charge one extra day in 12 minutes Full charge in 1–2 hours (manufacturer's claim)	Yes	Yes
Charge 6	Wristband	2023	Yes	No	Yes	Yes	Maybe	Yes	Yes	Yes	Yes	Built-in GPS	Yes	Yes	Yes	Waterproof, 50 m (160 ft)	(GPS); 6+ days	Yes	Yes
Ace LTE	Wristband	2024	Yes	No	Yes	No	No	No	No	Yes	Yes	Built-in GPS	Yes	No	Yes	Waterproof, 50 m (160 ft)	(GPS); 6+ days	Yes	Yes
Air	Wristband	2026	Yes	No	Yes	Yes	Maybe	Yes	Yes	No	Yes	Uses smartphone's GPS	Yes	No	Yes	Waterproof, 50 m (160 ft)	(6+ days	No	No

== Features of other products ==
Model	Type	Released	Tracks	Connectivity	Battery life
Aria	Scale	2012	Weight, body fat %, BMI	Wi-Fi	6 months
Flyer	Earbuds	2017	N/A	Bluetooth 4.2	6 hours
Aria 2	Scale	2017	Weight, body fat %, BMI	Wi-Fi	1 year
Aria Air	Scale	2019	Weight, BMI	Bluetooth 4.0	3AAA 1.5V batteries
