= James Park (entrepreneur) =

American technology entrepreneur and co-founder of FitBit

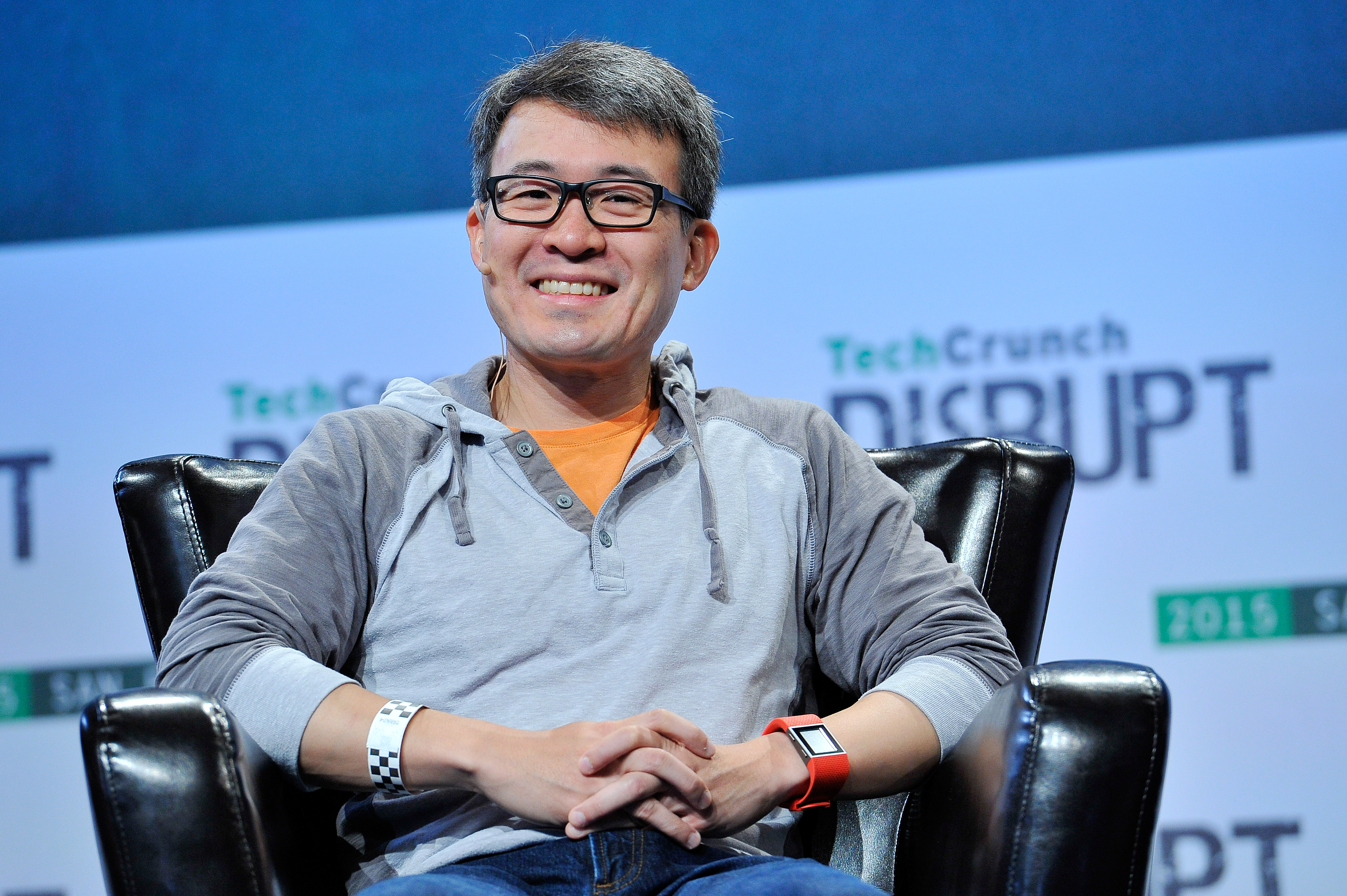
- Park in 2015
- Born: 1976 or 1977 (age 49–50)
- Education: Harvard College (dropped out)
- Occupation: Businessman
- Known for: Co-founder and CEO, Fitbit

James Park (born 1977) is an American technology entrepreneur. He co-founded Fitbit and has been its CEO and president since September 2007. He was named in 2015 among Fortune magazine's 40 Under 40, an annual ranking of the most influential young people in business. With a net worth of US$660 million estimated by Forbes, he was ranked #29 in the magazine's America's Richest Entrepreneurs Under 40 in 2015. Park announced that Fitbit became part of Google in January 2021.

== Early life ==
Park is of Korean descent.

He attended high school at the all-boys University School in Cleveland, Ohio. His parents, who emigrated from South Korea, owned a wig shop in downtown Cleveland, among other shops, such as an ice cream parlor, a fish market, a dry-cleaning business, and a clothing store. Park spent a lot of time in his parents' shops and even sold products for them, and his own work ethic was influenced by their example.

He studied computer science as an undergraduate at Harvard College but dropped out his junior year to pursue his own business. Before creating the company that would become Fitbit, Park created a startup B2B infrastructure software firm called Epesi Technologies, which is now defunct. Park considers Epesi Technologies his "greatest failure" and described the experience as "particularly painful".

Park met Eric Friedman (a computer science Yale graduate) at Epesi, but after the dot-com bubble burst in 2000 and Epesi closed its doors, both Park and Friedman went to work as engineers for a company called Dun & Bradstreet.

== Career ==
After Epesi folded, Park's next venture was an early concept for a photo editing and sharing platform. The company was called Heypix. After Heypix's first ever press release, it caught the attention of CNET, who offered the company $4 million.

Park co-founded Fitbit with Eric Friedman on March 26, 2007, after "realizing the potential of sensors on the Wii remote such as accelerometers paired with smaller and smaller devices". The co-founders started with an initial investment of $400,000 contributed by them and others but realized one year after starting that more funds would be needed for a product launch. They were able to get additional funding from SoftTech VC and True Ventures. Park found the initial stages of developing the product to be tough, especially in finding a hardware manufacturer. He recalled the search for the right supplier and organizing the production line in Asia left the company "pretty close to being dead". In a 2019 interview, Park said, "Going public is good for investors and employees. Ours was the largest consumer electronics IPO in US history."

Google purchased Fitbit in 2019 for $2.1 billion.

== Personal life ==
Forbes estimated that Park and Friedman each made $150 million before taxes when Fitbit was acquired by Google in 2019. Park describes himself as an introvert who is capable of being an extrovert. In his spare time he enjoys art.
