= Murder of Connie Dabate =

- Location: 7 Birchview Drive, Ellington, Connecticut, USA
- Date: December 23, 2015
- Attack type: Murder
- Weapon: Ruger .357 Magnum Revolver
- Victim: Connie Dabate
- Perpetrator: Richard Dabate
- Charges: Murder, tampering with evidence, giving false statements to police
- Verdict: Guilty on all counts

On December 23, 2015, Connie Dabate was murdered by her husband Richard Dabate in their Connecticut home. Richard was found guilty on May 10, 2022 of murder, tampering with evidence, and making false statements to the police and sentenced on August 18, 2022, to 65 years in prison for the murder of his wife.

The case gained national and international attention due to the state's use of Connie's Fitbit fitness tracker data to prove their case against Richard, the case has been commonly referred to as the "Fitbit murder" by news publications.

== Background ==
Connie (née Margotta) (1976–2015) and Richard Dabate were married on July 4, 2003. At the time of the murder, they had two young sons. Connie worked as a pharmaceutical sales representative for Reckitt Benckiser, and Richard was a computer network administrator. During the investigation, police found evidence of the couple's marriage problems, including Richard's affair with Sarah Ganzer, who Richard had found out was pregnant with his child shortly before the murder. The police also uncovered notes on Connie's phone listing reasons to file for divorce, a note listing reasons to stay with her husband, and evidence that the couple were having disagreements over their finances and Richard's spending. Richard had told Ganzer about a month before Connie's murder that he and Connie were planning on getting a divorce.

== Murder and investigation ==
Around 10 am on December 23, 2015, first responders arrived at the Dabate home in response to a panic alarm from the household security system. Connecticut State Police (CSP) officers found Richard on the kitchen floor, with his right wrist tied to a folding chair, with zip ties also attaching his ankles to the same chair. Richard told police that while he was on his way to work that morning he realized that he had forgotten his laptop at home and, after pulling over to email his boss on the side of the road, turned around to retrieve his laptop. Sources disagree whether the item that Richard claimed to forget was his laptop or was a work shirt. Upon returning home, Richard told police that he heard noises coming from the second floor of his home and went upstairs to investigate. Richard claimed that he discovered a man in the bedroom rifling through a closet. The purported intruder, allegedly a large man wearing a camouflage suit with a mask and who had a voice like actor Vin Diesel, overpowered Richard and took his wallet. According to Richard, Connie arrived home moments later, and Richard yelled for her to flee while the intruder allegedly used pressure points on Richard's wrist to restrain him. Richard then told police that Connie fled to the basement, the intruder followed her, and shot her in the back of the head and in the stomach. Richard then told police that the intruder zip tied him to a chair, stabbed him, and burned him with a blowtorch. Richard alleged that he struggled with the intruder and then burned his face with the blowtorch, causing him to flee.

The police secured and investigated the scene, and EMTs treated Richard for his injuries. While Richard was being treated in an ambulance on the property, the police used police dogs to try and find the scent trail of the supposed intruder. The police dogs only found Richard's scent, leading police officers to Richard in the ambulance several times.

Through the course of their investigation, CSP uncovered several holes in the story that Richard told police. Investigators and eventually the state's prosecutors uncovered the real series of events through a combination of forensic, digital, and other evidence. The course of events, as presented by CSP and prosecutors at trial, was significantly different and placed Richard in the center of the events on the day of the murder.

CSP found, through a series of interrogations and interviews, that Richard had lied to investigators about his affair and the state of his marriage. In the beginning of the investigation Richard initially told detectives that he and Connie had experienced fertility issues, and that Sarah Ganzer was going to serve as a surrogate through artificial insemination. Richard then did some "untraditional things" and had gotten Ganzer pregnant and told detectives that Connie was okay with the situation and planned to "co-parent" the baby. Some time later, Richard admitted to detectives that Ganzer was not a surrogate but a friend of his from high school; he also admitted that both he and Connie had both cheated on each other in the beginning of their marriage. Richard also told CSP that Ganzer, who was 10 weeks pregnant at the time of the murder, was expecting him to divorce Connie, while he and Connie were purportedly working to salvage their marriage. Investigators recovered more digital evidence regarding the Dabate's marriage including a 2014 entry in the "Notes" section of Connie's cellphone, titled "Why I want a divorce". The listed reasons concerned Richard's immature behavior, his irresponsibility with money, his poor parenting, and his failure to care for her. The day before the murder the couple had an argument over text where Connie accused Richard of lying about a cable bill.

CSP's investigation also unveiled the real timeline of the murder and Richard's movements on the day. Investigators found that Richard used his computer during the time he was allegedly driving to work. At 8:41 am he logged into his Outlook email account from the Dabate home's IP address, indicating that the laptop was being used on the home's network. At 9:18 am he looked at the "Group Exercise Schedule" for the Indian Valley YMCA, and soon after searched the ESPN website for the Mike & Mike show, his last time using the laptop that morning. The use of the Dabate home IP address indicated to investigators that Richard did not email his boss from the side of the road, as he had told them, but emailed his boss from the home.

Connie was also wearing a Fitbit One fitness tracking device clipped to the waistband of her pants that morning. The Fitbit tracked the steps that Connie had taken, as well as flights of stairs climbed, distance traveled, general activity levels, and calories burned while Connie was wearing it. The Fitbit data indicated that Connie's last movements inside the home were at 10:05 am, contradicting the timeline that Richard gave police, which put Connie's death just after 9 am.
