= Palm (Android device) =

Android smartphone

- Also known as: Palm PVG100
- Developer: Palm Ventures Group
- Manufacturer: Tinno Mobile
- Type: Smartphone; Wearable device
- First released: November 2, 2018; 8 years ago
- Compatible networks: 2G GSM/EDGE, 3G UMTS/HSPA, 4G LTE
- Form factor: Slate
- Dimensions: 96.6 mm × 50.6 mm × 7.4 mm (3.80 in × 1.99 in × 0.29 in)
- Weight: 62.5 g (2.20 oz)
- Operating system: Original: Android 8.1 "Oreo"
- System-on-chip: Qualcomm Snapdragon 435
- CPU: MSM8940 Octa-core (4x1.4 GHz and 4x1.1 GHz) Kryo 360
- GPU: Adreno 505
- Memory: 3 GB RAM
- Storage: 32 GB
- Removable storage: non-expandable
- Battery: 800 mAh
- Rear camera: 12MP with flash
- Front camera: 8MP
- Display: 3.3 in (83.8 mm) 1280x720 LCD (445 ppi)
- Sound: Dual purpose speaker
- Connectivity: Bluetooth 4.2 low energy Wi-Fi b/g/n (2.4GHz); USB-C
- Data inputs: G-Sensor; Glonass GPS; Proximity sensor; E-compass; Gyroscope
- Model: PVG100
- Codename: Pepito
- Other: Fleksy on-screen virtual keyboard
- Website: www.palm.com

The Palm (model number PVG100), also informally known as the "Palm companion device", "Palm Palm" or "TCL Palm", is a smartphone running the Android operating system, announced on October 15, 2018, and was first available in the United States from November 2, that year. At its time, it was notable for being very small in size similar to a credit card. It was created by Dennis Miloseski and Howard Nuk in San Francisco and financially backed by TCL, who owned the Palm trademark, originally of Palm, Inc. At launch it was meant to be only used as a "companion" paired device to another smartphone, but this restriction was eventually lifted.

== Features ==
With a 3.3-inch screen and 62.5 g weight that is noticeably smaller (width of 1.99 inches and a height of 3.8 inches) and lighter than other smartphones released at the same time, the Palm was initially marketed as "an ultra-mobile companion" device that is meant to be used in conjunction with a regular smartphone—positioning it as a cross-over between a wearable and a smartphone, and originally could only be used by pairing the device with another phone on the Verizon network. However, the restriction was subsequently lifted for new buyers as well as overseas markets, which make it also possible to use the device as a standalone phone.

Shipping with Android 8.1 Oreo, it is constructed from crafted billet aluminum mid-frame. The display is a 1280x720 resolution LCD with 445 ppi. The Palm companion phone has a non-removable 800-mAh battery. It is also IP68 dust and water resistant, but lacks volume buttons. It was built on a rather low-end Qualcomm Snapdragon 435 processor and has 32 GB non-expandable internal storage, and 3 GB of RAM. The Palm has a rear camera (12 megapixels) as well as a front camera which can also be used for face unlock.

== Development ==
The Palm was codenamed Pepito. It was developed, designed, and marketed by Palm Ventures Group, a San Francisco-based start up founded by Dennis Miloseski and Howard Nuk. Palm Ventures was financially backed by Chinese electronics company TCL that owns the Palm trademark, originally of Palm, Inc. As a result, the Palm became the first "Palm"-branded mobile device on the market since 2010 (Palm Pre 2).

The phone was manufactured by China's Tinno Mobile as an ODM for TCL.

== Availability ==
The Palm was initially launched on November 2, 2018, exclusively on Verizon in the US as a companion device in a bundle with a phone it costed $349 (equivalent to $447 in 2025) and also required a mandatory $10 monthly companion subscription to share the cell number (relying on the carrier's eSIM network architecture).

Vodafone secured a 6 months exclusivity deal for the Palm in Europe. In December 2018 it became available on Vodafone in Germany, Spain and the UK. On January 20, 2019, the device has been available in Hong Kong.

It was released for sale as standalone device on Verizon in the US in April 2019, requiring no subscription or pairing with another smartphone. Verizon temporarily offered it for a cut-price $199.

On April 24, 2019, the Palm was released in Japan.

== Reception ==
When the phone was first announced, some had called it an ambitious product. It publicly gained the support of basketball player Stephen Curry and design house Kate Spade released a case for it.

Critical reviewers of the Palm often praised its sleek miniature design and digital detoxing novelty, but had criticism for some flaws, overpriced, and unsatisfying battery life.
