= TCL 10 5G =

Android-based smartphone

- Brand: TCL
- Manufacturer: TCL Technology
- First released: 20 July 2020; 5 years ago
- Dimensions: 163.65×76.56×9.05 mm (6.443×3.014×0.356 in)
- Weight: 210 g (7 oz)
- Operating system: Android 10
- System-on-chip: Qualcomm Snapdragon 765G chipset
- CPU: Qualcomm Kryo 460 Octa-Core(1 x Gold Prime 2.4GHz, 1 x Gold 2.2GHz, 6 x Silver 1.8GHz)
- GPU: Adreno 620
- Memory: 6GB RAM
- Storage: 128GB
- Battery: 4500mAh
- Rear camera: 64-megapixel (f/1.89) + 8-megapixel (f/2.2) + 5-megapixel (f/2.2) + 2-megapixel (f/2.4)
- Front camera: 16MP(f/2.2)
- Display: 6.53 inch FHD+ Dotch LCD + 1080 x 2340pixels, Screen-to-body ratio: 91%
- Sound: 3.5mm audio jack, loudspeaker
- Website: Official website

The TCL 10 5G, which was announced on 6 April 2020, is an Android-based smartphone manufactured by TCL, as part of its fifth-generation TCL 10 series lineup. The TCL 10 5G features a durable dual side glass back with a "light-catching metallic gradient”.

== Specifications ==
=== Hardware ===
TCL 10 5G is powered by a Qualcomm 765G chipset and Adreno 620 GPU, equipped with a 128 GB internal storage, and supports micro SDXC card up to 1 TB. It operates on TCL UI, a customized version of Android 10.TCL 10 5G has a 16 MP front camera and 4 rear cameras: 64 MP (f/1.89)+8 MP (f/2.2)+5 MP (f/2.2)+2 MP (f/2.4). It measures 163.65 mm × 76.56 mm × 9.05 mm and weighs 210 g. TCL 10 5G has a non-removable Li-Po Battery rated at 4500 mAh and is powered by 9V2A Quick Charger 3.0. It is equipped with sensors including A-GPS, BeiDou, Galileo, Global Navigation Satellite System, GPS (GPS L1+L5 support), Quasi-Zenith Satellite System, accelerometer, E-Compass, gyro sensor, proximity sensor, and RGB light sensor.

== Memory ==
TCL 10 5G has 6 GB of RAM and 128 GB of built in memory and a dedicated Micro SDXC card slot which supports up to 1024 GB of additional storage.

== Display ==
TCL 10 5G has a 6.53-inch FHD+ Dotch™ LCD (1080 × 2340 pixels), and a pixel density of 395PPI, with screen to body ratio of 91%.

== Battery ==
TCL 10 5G is equipped with a non removable 4500 mAH Li-Po battery, powered by 9V2A Quick Charger 3.0.

== Camera ==
The TCL 10 5G is equipped with 4 rear cameras which including a 64 MP camera with f/1.89 aperture, a 8 MP camera with f/2.2 aperture, a 5 MP camera with f/2.2 aperture, and a 2 MP camera with f/2.4 aperture. It supports video capture of 720P & 1080P @60FPS, 720P, 1080P & 4K @30FPS, and slow motion video capture of 720P @960FPS, 1080P & 720P @240/120FPS. The phone’s camera features include auto zoom, super wide angle mode, super macro mode, and others. The front-facing camera is 16 MP with an f/2.2 aperture supporting features like face beautifications (photos), filters and support 720P & 1080P recording at 30 fps.

== Colors ==
TCL 10 5G is available in two colors chrome blue, and mercury gray.

== Software ==
TCL 10 5G runs on TCL UI powered by Android 10.

== Connectivity ==
TCL 10 5G has 5G connectivity.
