= Keyboard computer =

Type of personal computer

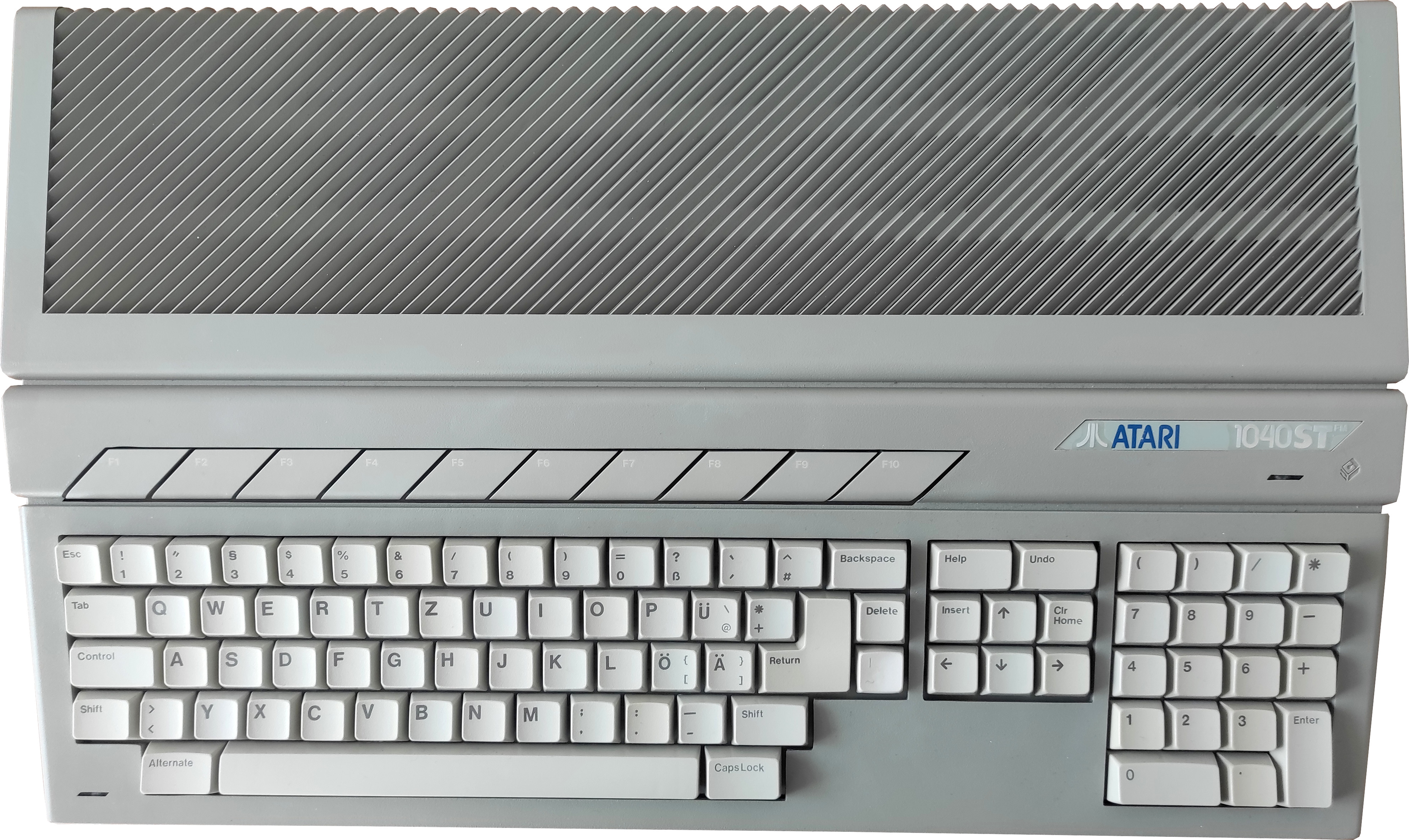
Atari 1040 STFM

A keyboard computer is a computer which contains all of the regular components of a personal computer, except for a screen, in the same housing as the keyboard. The power supply is often external and connects to the computer via an adapter cable. The motherboard is specially designed to fit inside, and the device is larger than most standard keyboards. Additional peripheral devices such as a monitor are connected to the computer via external ports. Usually a minimum of storage devices, if any, is built in.

Most home computers produced during the late 1970s and 1980s were keyboard computers, the ZX Spectrum and the best selling models of the Atari ST, Xiao Bawang, Commodore 64, Apple II, and Amiga being prime examples. While this form factor went out of style around 1990 in favour for more modular desktop setups, some notable x86 keyboard computers have been built, like the Olivetti Prodest PC1 in 1988 and the Schneider Euro PC Series between 1988 and 1995.

Newer computers to employ this form factor include the Commodore 64 WebIt by Tulip, the Asus Eee Keyboard, which uses Intel Atom processors and Solid-state drive, and the unreleased Commodore Invictus PC. In November 2020, Raspberry Pi Foundation announced Raspberry Pi 400, a modified version of their previous Raspberry Pi 4 housed entirely within a keyboard. Similarly, in December of 2024, the Raspberry Pi Foundation released the Raspberry Pi 500 and, in September of 2025, released the Raspberry Pi 500+, both based on the Raspberry Pi 5.

In 2026, HP released the HP EliteBoard G1a based on the X64 processor architecture.

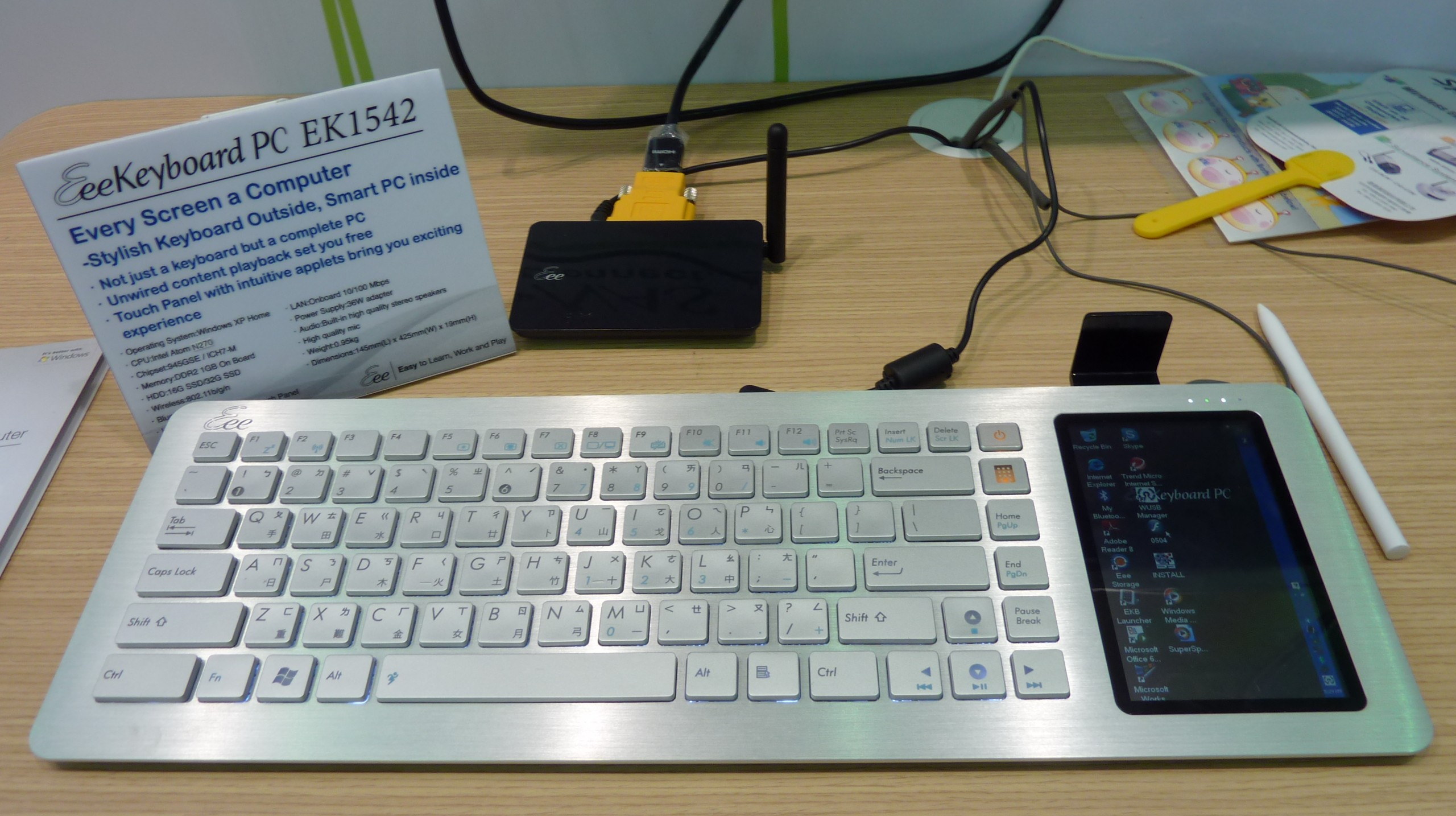
ASUS Eee Keyboard computer

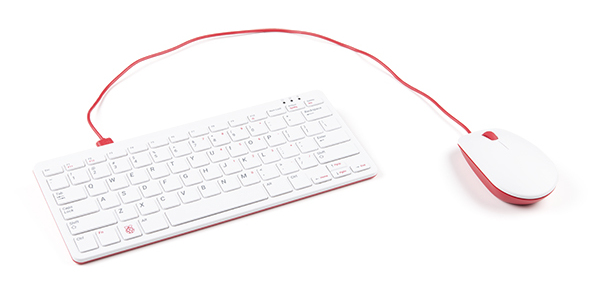
Raspberry Pi 400

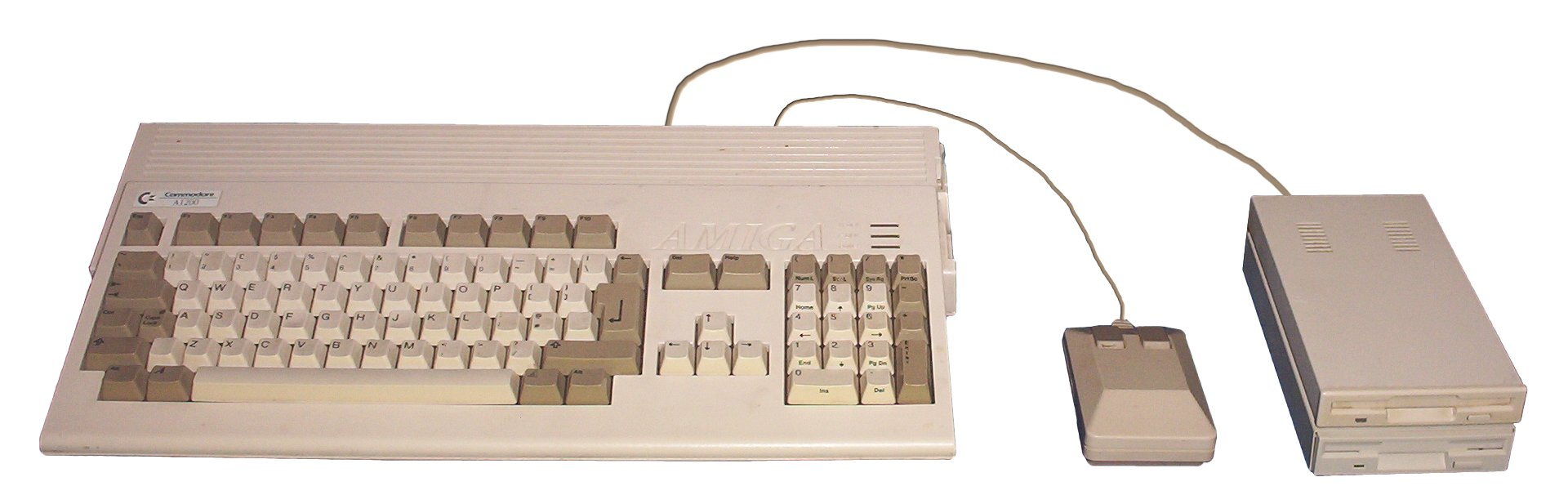
Amiga 1200

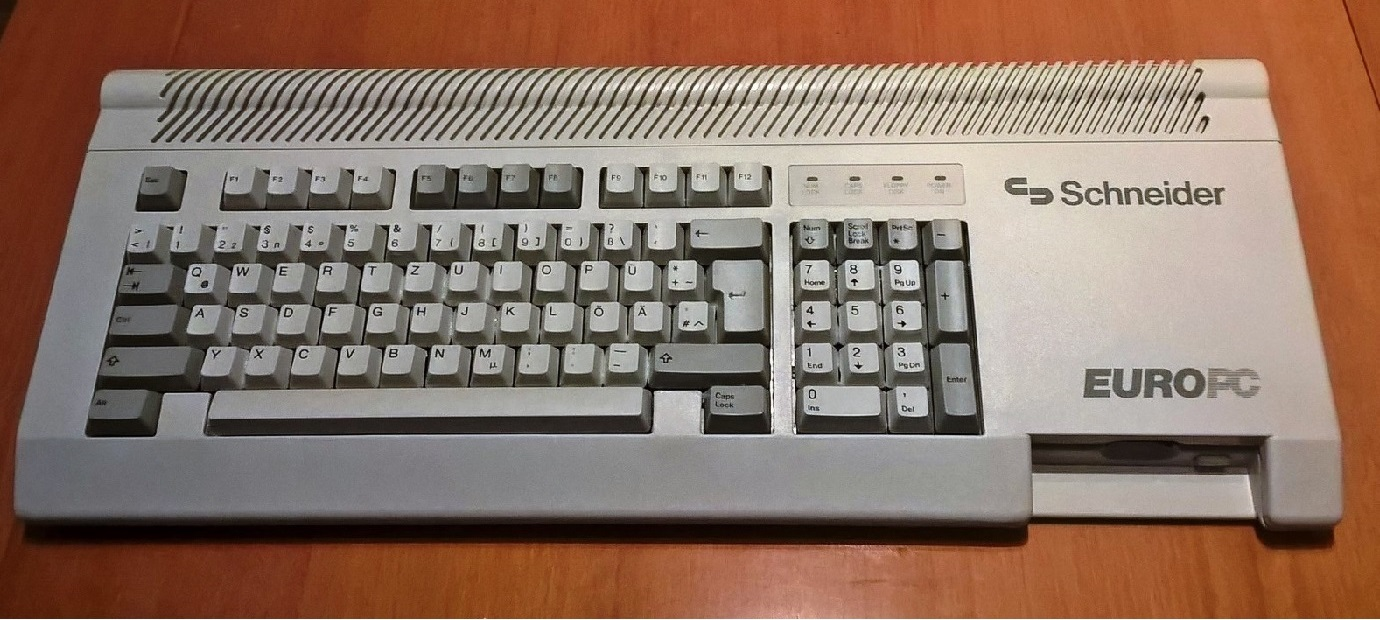
Schneider Euro PC

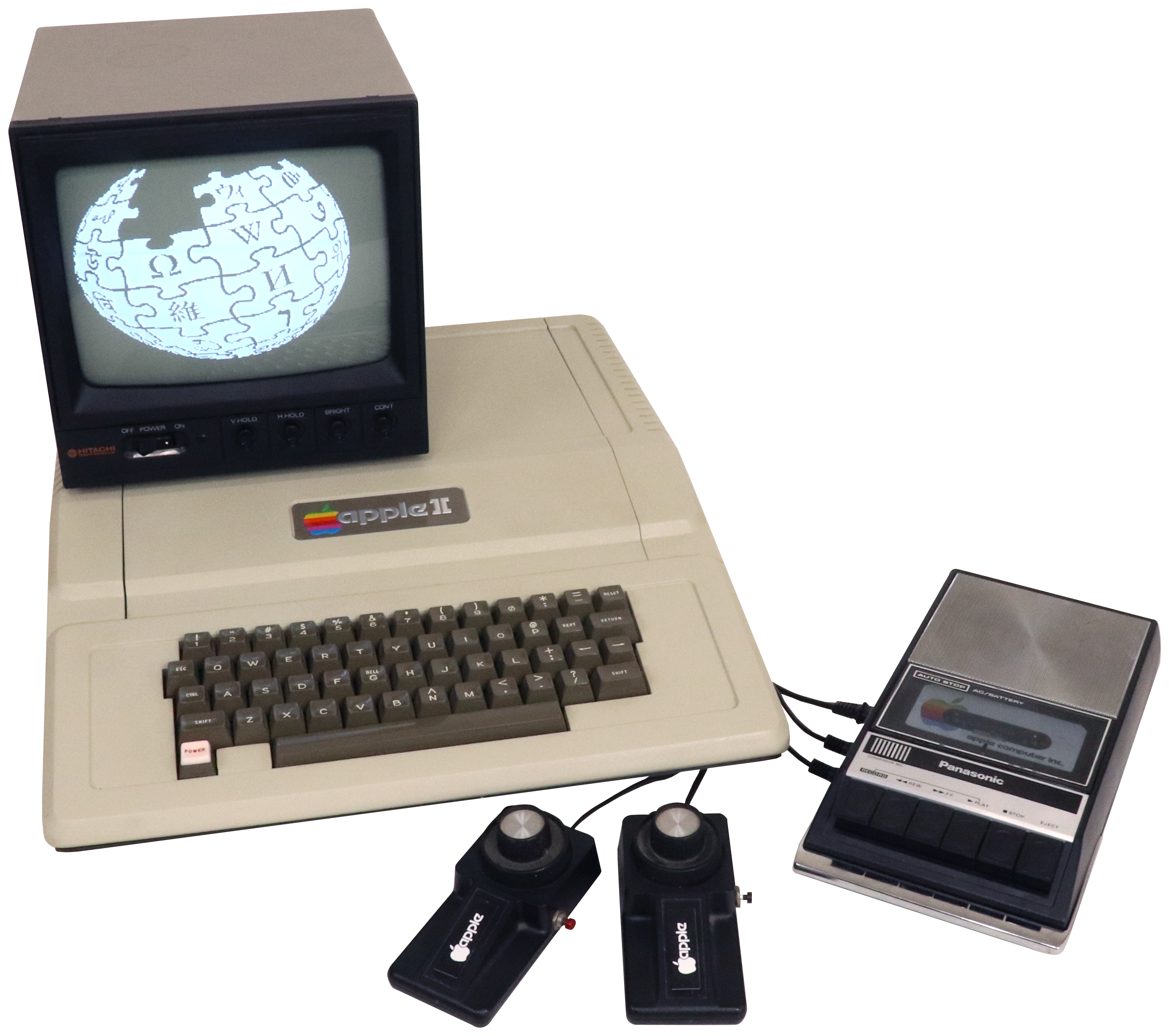
Apple II

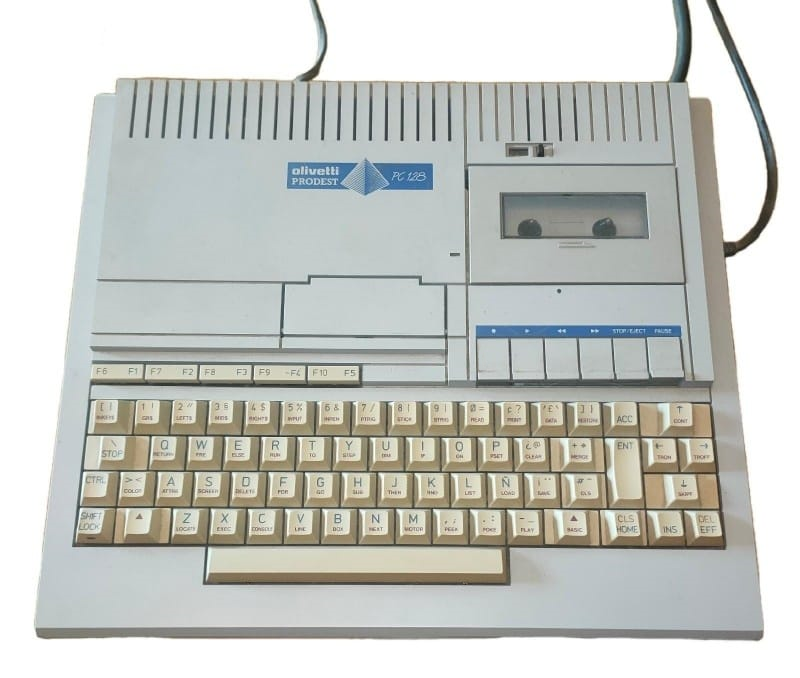
Olivetti Prodest PC128

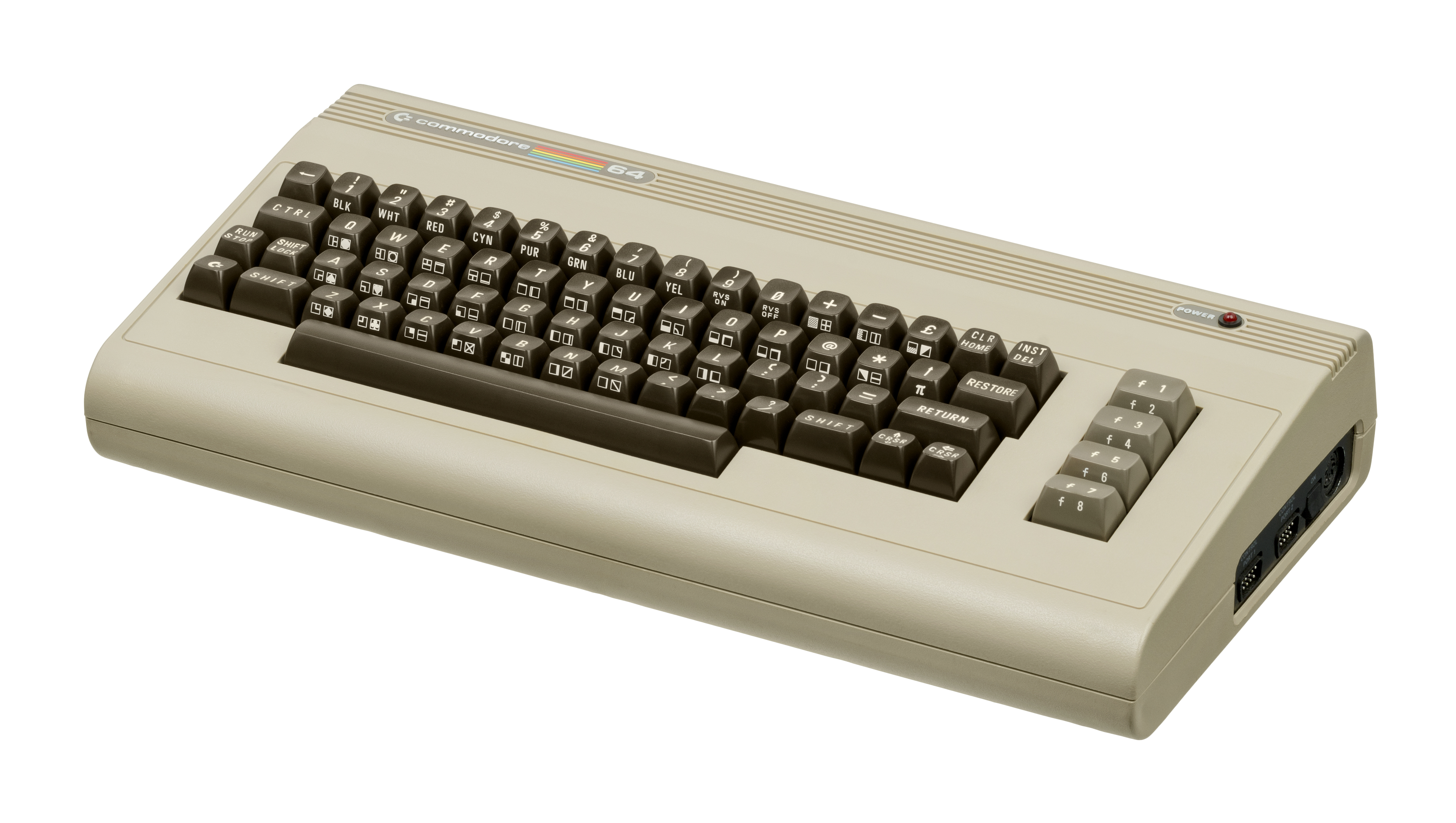
Commodore 64

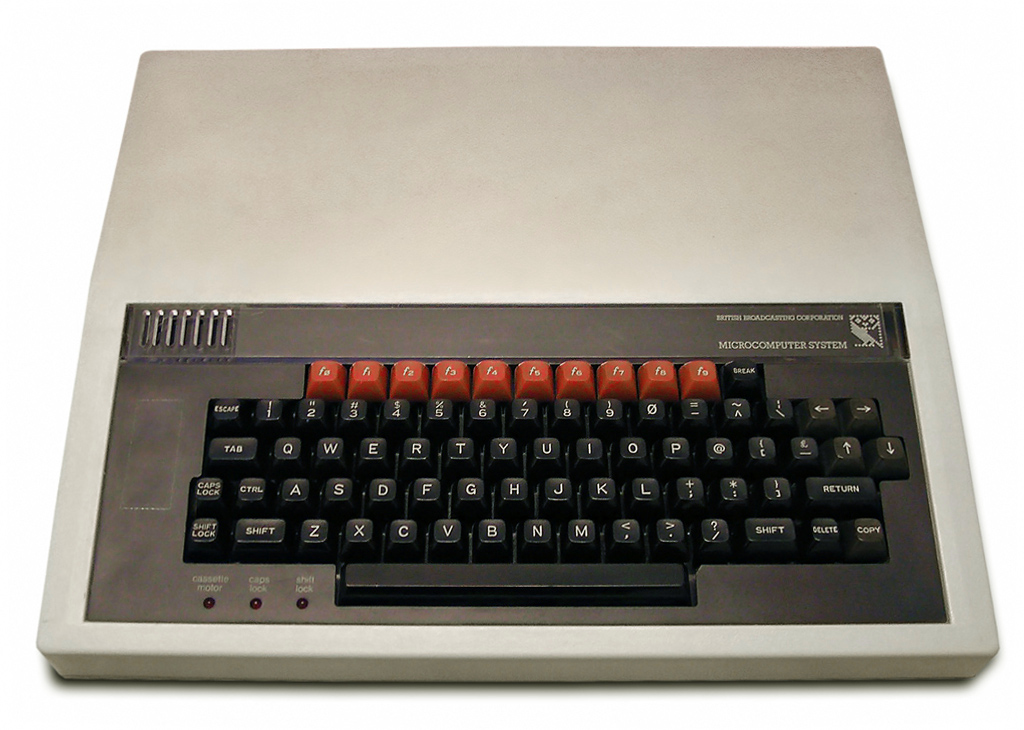
BBC Micro

== List of best selling keyboard computers ==
Best selling keyboard computers
Image	Computer	Units sold	Year released
	Commodore 64	~17 million	1982
	Amiga 500	~6 million	1987
	MSX	~5 million	1983
	ZX Spectrum	~5 million	1982
	Timex Sinclair 1000	~0.5 million in first 6 months	1982

== See also ==
- IBM PC keyboard
- All-in-one computer
- History of computing
- Home computer
- Headless computer
