= Howard Nuk =

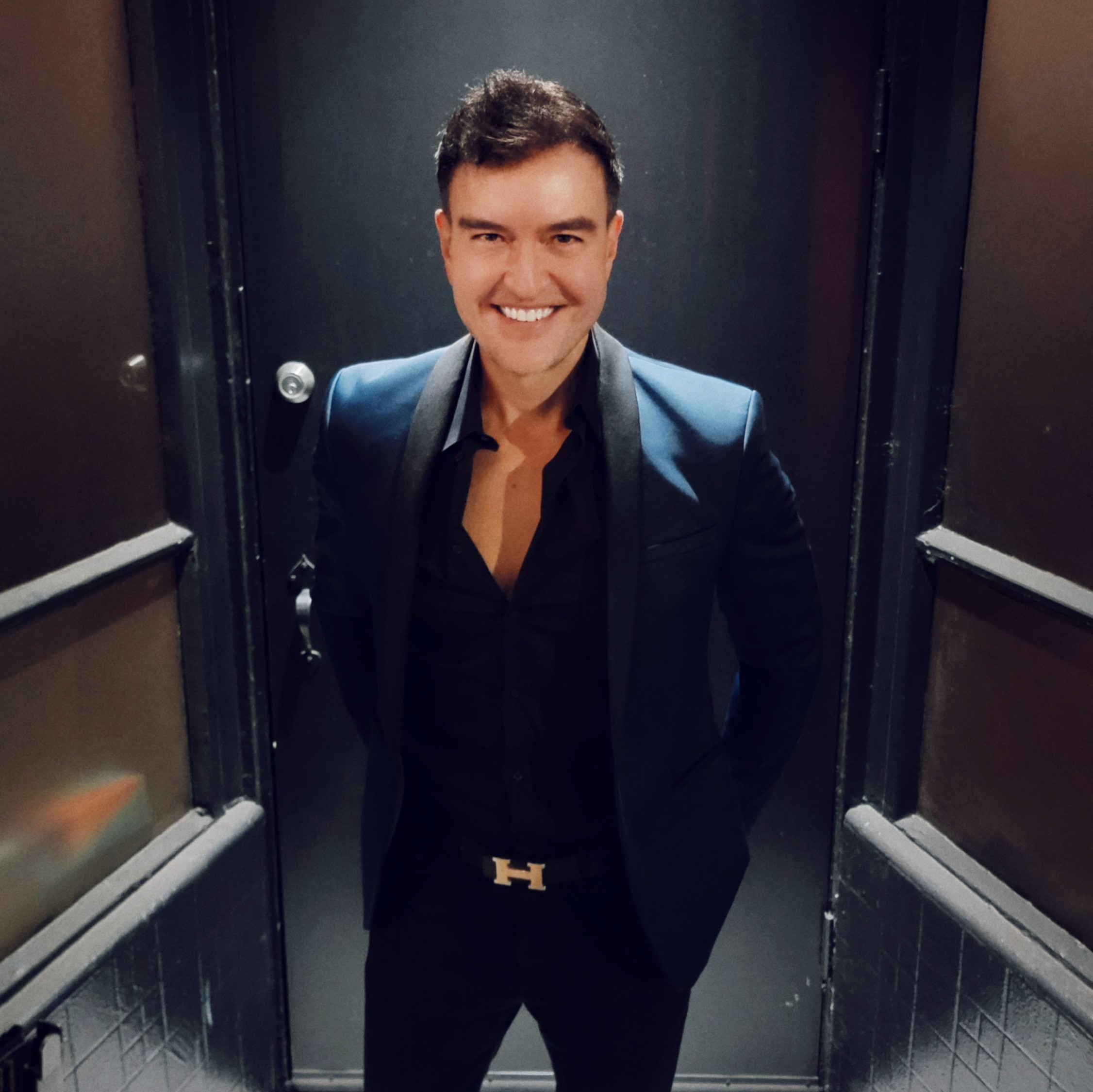
- Howard Nuk (left) with Co-founder Dennis Miloseski (right) and Palm Advisor and Investor Stephen Curry (center)
- Born: Toronto, Canada
- Education: Carleton University
- Occupations: Industrial and product design leader, entrepreneur, inventor, speaker, and co-founder of Palm Ventures Group, Inc.

Howard Nuk is a Canadian industrial and product design leader, entrepreneur, inventor, speaker, and co-founder of Palm Ventures Group, Inc. Nuk studied industrial design at Carleton University, School of Industrial Design, Faculty of Engineering, where he graduated with a Bachelor of Industrial Design (B.I.D.) with high distinction. Born in Toronto, Canada, he lived there until his family moved to Ottawa at the age of 11.

After graduation, Nuk was hired by the global design and innovation firm frog design (frog) based in the San Francisco Bay Area. Nuk relocated from Canada to California in May 2000 and began his career at frog working under designer Hartmut Esslinger and over the next 11 years, Nuk would become creative director and lead frog's west coast design teams.

Nuk was recruited to San Francisco-based design firm Ammunition as vice president of the Industrial Design Studio in 2010 where he worked with partners Matthew Rolandson, Nuk's former frog colleague, and Robert Brunner, former Apple Design Director who famously hired Jony Ive.

Nuk joined Samsung Design America (SDA) in 2012, where he met Dennis Miloseski, a fellow design leader and future co-founder. As vice president of industrial design, Nuk designed mobile phones, wearables, audio products, and home IOT products for Samsung from 2012 to 2016.

In 2016, Nuk and Miloseski co-founded the San Francisco-based startup Palm Ventures Group Inc (PVG) where they secured global exclusive rights to the original Palm brand. Nuk and Miloseski also brought on 3-time NBA champ, 5-time All-Star, the first unanimous MVP basketball star Stephen Curry as a strategic investor and advisor to PVG.

From 2016 to 2018 Nuk presided as an advisory board member at the Miami-based Industrial Arts & Method (IAM) foundation with former executive at Motorola and Pininfarina, Franco Lodato, and former executive director of the MIT Media Lab, Walter Bender.

== Career ==
=== Frog ===
Nuk began his career at frog working under mentor and renowned designer Hartmut Esslinger who famously designed the Apple Macintosh SE with Steve Jobs from 1983 to 1989. Nuk served as creative director at international design and innovation firm frog design inc. for 11 years where he led industrial and product design for their West coast offices. At frog, Nuk designed the first ever Disney home electronics line. He also designed mobile phones for Motorola and Nokia, conference equipment for Polycom, and sporting equipment for Titleist.

=== Ammunition ===
In 2012 Nuk moved to Ammunition as Vice President of the Industrial Design Studio At Ammunition, Nuk lead his design team to create products for clients such as Beats by Dre, Nook by Barnes and Noble, Adobe and Sky. Notably, Nuk worked directly with Square and Twitter founder Jack Dorsey to design Square's suite of products including the Square Reader, Wireless Square Reader, and Square Stand.

=== Samsung ===
As Vice President of Design at Samsung Design America, Nuk led the design and development of products within the mobile and home IOT ecosystem. Nuk's charter at Samsung Design America was to disrupt established mobile and consumer electronic markets, define new categories of business for Samsung, and design innovative new products. Nuk developed a range of mobile and wearable tech products, including the Samsung Gear IconX, Samsung Gear IconX 2018, Samsung Galaxy Buds, Samsung Gear Fit 1, Samsung Gear Fit 2, Samsung Galaxy View, Samsung Gear S, Samsung Gear S2, Samsung Gear Circle, and the Samsung Level headphones lineup which includes Samsung Level-over headphones, Samsung Level-on headphones, and Samsung Level-in earbuds.

=== Palm ===
Nuk, along with co-founder Dennis Miloseski, relaunched the Palm brand, which announced its first device, also called "Palm" on October 15, 2018. Nuk and Miloseski co-founded the San Francisco-based startup Palm Ventures Group which was incorporated on December 19, 2016. Nuk and Miloseski secured global exclusive rights to the original Palm brand, made famous in the mid-'90s from the launch of the PalmPilot from TCL Corporation, who had purchased the Palm brand assets from Hewlett-Packard in 2014.

The product Nuk and Miloseski created is a credit card-sized smartphone that features a 3.3-inch HD display, two cameras, and IP68 water and dust resistance. "The design is undeniably cute and sleek. The user interface is simple, and the raison d'être is well thought out."

In 2017, Nuk and Miloseski approached the San Francisco Bay Area-based basketball icon Stephen Curry to invest in Palm. Like his Warriors teammates Andre Iguodala and Kevin Durant, Curry has strong ties to the Silicon Valley startup ecosystem. According to Curry, he still associated the Palm brand with the PalmPilot his father Dell Curry had carried years ago and the games he had played on it as a child. Once Curry learned about the new device and its ambitions, he found it so intriguing that he “From the jump, I fell in love with [it],” Curry remembers.

Nuk and Miloseski launched the Palm phone on November 2, 2018, exclusively at Verizon. Since its launch, the Palm phone has sold globally through retail partners in over 12 countries, including US, UK, Spain, Germany China, Japan, and Ukraine.
