= Huawei Nova 12i =

Android mid-range smartphone

Huawei Nova 12i (Huawei Enjoy 70 Pro in China) Huawei Nova 13i Wiko Hi Enjoy 70 Pro 5G
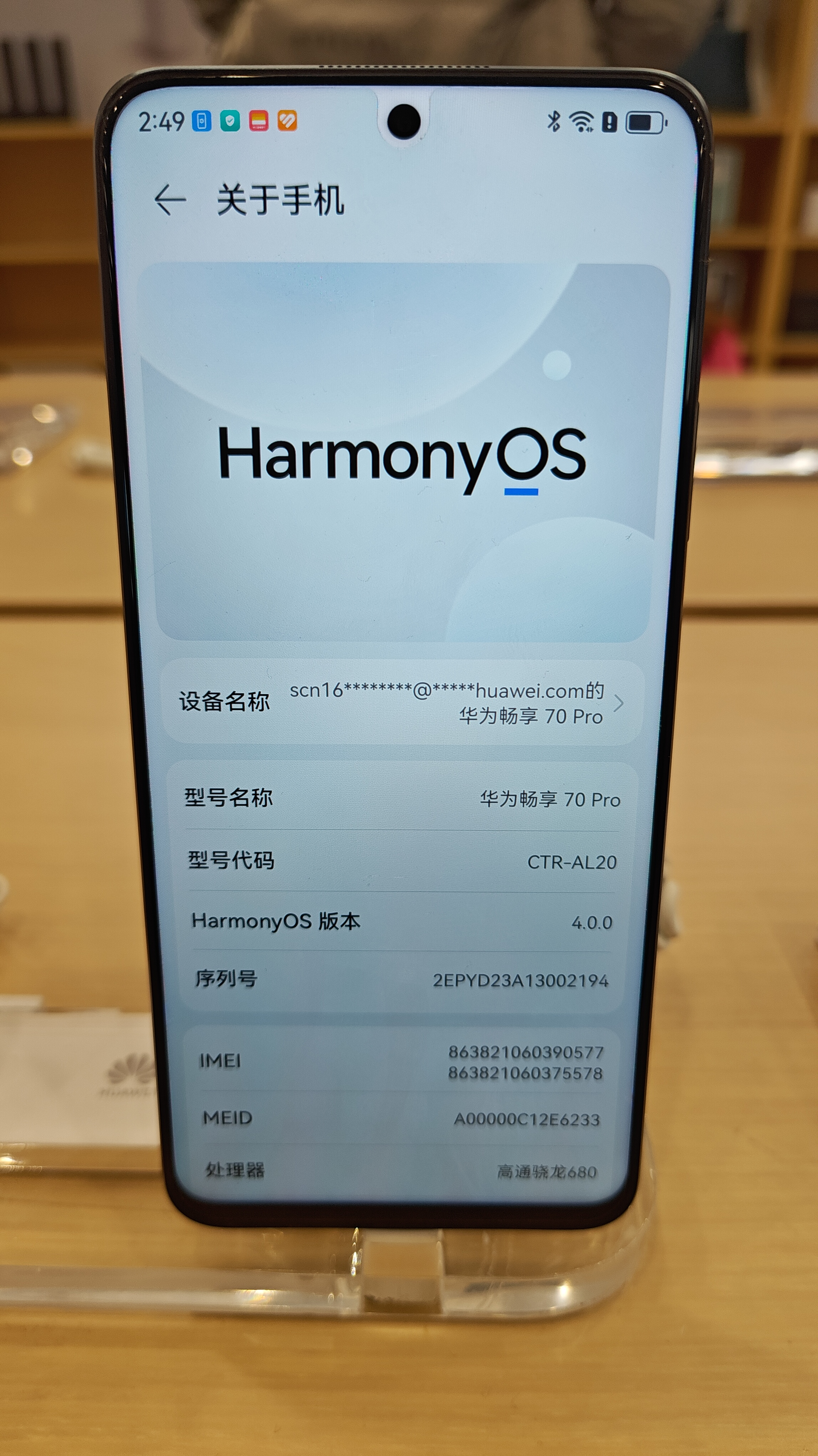
- Front of the Huawei Enjoy 70 Pro
- Brand: Huawei, Wiko
- Manufacturers: Huawei, Wiko
- Type: Phablet
- Series: Huawei Nova/Enjoy; Wiko Hi Enjoy
- First released: Nova 12i: March 19, 2024; 2 years ago Nova 13i: December 14, 2024; 20 months ago Enjoy 70 Pro: January 8, 2024; 2 years ago Hi Enjoy 70 Pro 5G: March 29, 2024; 2 years ago
- Predecessor: Huawei Nova 11i Huawei Enjoy 60 Pro; Wiko Hi Enjoy 60 Pro 5G
- Successor: Huawei Nova 14i Huawei Enjoy 90 Pro Max; Wiko Hi Enjoy 80 Pro
- Compatible networks: Nova 12i/13i/Enjoy 70 Pro: GSM, 3G, 4G (LTE); Hi Enjoy 70 Pro 5G: GSM, 3G, 4G (LTE), 5G
- Form factor: Slate
- Colors: Nova 12i: Black; Green; Nova 13i: White; Blue; Enjoy 70 Pro/Hi Enjoy 70 Pro 5G: Obsidian Black; Snow White; Emerald Green
- Dimensions: H: 163.3 mm W: 74.7 mm D: 8.4 mm
- Weight: 199 g (7 oz)
- Operating system: Nova 12i: Initial: Android 12 (without Google Mobile Services) + EMUI 14; Current: Android 12 (without Google Mobile Services) + EMUI 14.2; Nova 13i: Android 12 (without Google Mobile Services) + EMUI 14.2; Enjoy 70 Pro: Initial: HarmonyOS 4.0; Current: HarmonyOS 4.2; Hi Enjoy 70 Pro 5G: HarmonyOS Connect
- System-on-chip: Nova 12i/13i/Enjoy 70 Pro: Qualcomm SM6225 Snapdragon 680 4G (6 nm); Hi Enjoy 70 Pro 5G: MediaTek Dimensity 700 (7 nm)
- Memory: 8 GB LPDDR4X
- Storage: 128/256 GB UFS 2.2
- SIM: Dual SIM (Nano-SIM)
- Battery: Non-removable Li-Po 5000 mAh
- Charging: 40 W fast charging (Huawei SuperCharge Turbo 2.0)
- Rear camera: 108 MP, f/1.9, 26 mm (wide), PDAF + 2 MP, f/2.4 (depth); LED flash, panorama, HDR; Video: 1080p@30fps
- Front camera: 8 MP, f/2.0 (wide); Video: 1080p@30fps
- Display: IPS LCD, 90 Hz, 6.7", 2388 × 1080 (FHD+), 19.8:9 aspect ratio, 391 ppi
- Website: consumer.huawei.com/en/phones/nova-12i/

The Huawei Nova 12i (stylized as HUAWEI nova 12i) is a mid-range phablet from the Nova series, developed by Huawei. It was announced on March 19, 2024. In China, the smartphone was introduced on January 8, 2024, under the name Huawei Enjoy 70 Pro. On December 14, 2024, the Huawei Nova 13i was introduced, which differs from its predecessor only in color variations.

On March 29, 2024, Wiko introduced the Hi Enjoy 70 Pro 5G, which primarily differs from the Huawei Enjoy 70 Pro by its system-on-chip that supports 5G and a modified main camera module.

== Design ==
The front panel is made of glass, while the frame and rear cover are constructed from matte plastic. In terms of design, the Wiko Hi Enjoy 70 Pro 5G differs from the Huawei models because its camera housing island matches the color of the back panel, whereas the Huawei Nova 12i, Nova 13i, and Enjoy 70 Pro maintain a black camera island across all color schemes.

On the bottom edge, there is a dual Nano-SIM card slot, a primary microphone, a USB-C port, and the loudspeaker. The top edge houses a secondary microphone. The right side features the volume control rocker and a power/lock button that integrates a capacitive fingerprint scanner.

The smartphones are available in the following color configurations:

Huawei Nova 12i		Huawei Nova 13i		Huawei Enjoy 70 Pro / Wiko Hi Enjoy 70 Pro 5G	
Color	Name	Color	Name	Color	Name
	Black		White		Obsidian Black
	Green		Blue		Snow White
					Emerald Green

== Specifications ==
=== Hardware ===
The Huawei Nova 12i, Nova 13i, and Enjoy 70 Pro are equipped with a budget-tier Qualcomm Snapdragon 680 4G system-on-chip, while the Wiko Hi Enjoy 70 Pro 5G features a MediaTek Dimensity 700. All models are configured with 8 GB of LPDDR4X RAM paired with either 128 GB or 256 GB of UFS 2.2 internal storage.

The devices pack a non-removable 5000 mAh battery, which supports Huawei's SuperCharge Turbo 2.0 protocol up to 40 W.

The display is a 6.7-inch IPS LCD screen with a Full HD+ resolution (2388 × 1080), featuring a 391 ppi pixel density, a 19.8:9 aspect ratio, a 90 Hz refresh rate, and a centered hole-punch cutout for the front-facing camera.

For optics, the Huawei variants carry a dual-camera system highlighted by a 108 MP wide lens with a f/1.9 aperture and PDAF. Conversely, the Wiko Hi Enjoy 70 Pro 5G substitutes this with a 50 MP sensor carrying a f/1.8 opening with PDAF. Both systems are supplemented by a secondary 2 MP depth sensor with a f/2.4 aperture. Selfie duties are handled by an 8 MP wide lens with a f/2.0 aperture. Both the primary and front camera set arrays support video recording at a maximum resolution of 1080p at 30fps.

=== Software ===
- Huawei Nova 12i: Originally shipped with EMUI 14 based on an open-source Android 12 platform (without Google Mobile Services) and was updated to EMUI 14.2.
- Huawei Nova 13i: Shipped natively with EMUI 14.2 based on Android 12 (without Google Mobile Services).
- Huawei Enjoy 70 Pro: Shipped running HarmonyOS 4.0 and was subsequently updated to HarmonyOS 4.2.
- Wiko Hi Enjoy 70 Pro 5G: Released running the HarmonyOS Connect ecosystem out of the box.

Preceded by Huawei Nova 11i	Huawei Nova 12i 2024	Succeeded by Huawei Nova 13i
Preceded by Huawei Nova 12i	Huawei Nova 13i 2024	Succeeded by Huawei Nova 14i
Preceded by Huawei Enjoy 60 Pro	Huawei Enjoy 70 Pro; 2024	Succeeded by Huawei Enjoy 90 Pro Max
Preceded by Wiko Hi Enjoy 60 Pro 5G	Wiko Hi Enjoy 70 Pro 5G; 2024	Succeeded by Wiko Hi Enjoy 80 Pro
