= Dennis Miloseski =

American product designer and entrepreneur

- Born: Detroit, Michigan, U.S.
- Education: Art Institute of Pittsburgh; Harvard Business School
- Occupations: Product executive, inventor, entrepreneur, speaker, and co-founder of Palm Ventures Group, Inc.

Dennis Miloseski is an American product and design executive, entrepreneur, inventor, speaker, and co-founder and executive board member of Palm Ventures Group, Inc. Miloseski studied design at the Art Institute of Pittsburgh and business at Harvard Business School, Executive Education. Born in Detroit, Michigan, Miloseski relocated to the San Francisco Bay Area in 1998 and began his career in the Silicon Valley.

Miloseski was hired by the global internet search company Google based in the San Francisco Bay Area. As an early design and user experience leader at the company, Miloseski joined Google and managed the design teams responsible for launching the end-to-end experiences for products such as Gmail, Google Calendar, Google Reader, Google Docs, and Google Spreadsheets.

Miloseski later led special projects at Google and served as the head of design for confidential platform efforts at Google. During this time, he was a design, research, and user experience leader across YouTube, Google TV, and Chromecast projects. Miloseski was awarded the OC Award by top executives and the exclusive Founder's Award by Larry Page and Sergey Brin for his outstanding contributions to innovation at Google.

Miloseski was recruited to the global consumer electronics maker Samsung Electronics as global vice president, head of studio at Samsung Design America in 2012 where he worked closely with Mobile Electronics CEO J.K. Shin to help usher in a new era of innovation in Samsung's mobile division. Miloseski helped Samsung introduce new category creating products which included mobile smartphones, wearables, audio, and smart home IOT products.

In addition to his responsibilities at Samsung Design America, Miloseski was also the head of Samsung's Mobile Experience Lab (UXCA), focused on innovation and creating software and services for Samsung's mobility product portfolio.

During his time at Samsung, Miloseski met Howard Nuk, an industrial design leader and future co-founder at Palm.

In 2016, Miloseski and Nuk co-founded the San Francisco-based startup Palm Ventures Group Inc where they secured global exclusive rights to the original Palm brand. Miloseski and Nuk also brought on three-time NBA champ, five-time All-Star, the first unanimous MVP basketball star Stephen Curry as a strategic investor and advisor to Palm Ventures Group.

Miloseski is also an investor and advisory board member at Skipify which lets e-commerce customers purchase anything with just one-touch across the web, email, and social media feeds.

== Career ==
=== GE ===
Miloseski served as design leader at GE Medical, Healthcare Solutions where he was the design and user experience principal for the business. During his tenure at GE, he planned, directed, and led all user interface, user experience, and usability initiatives for GE Medical, Healthcare Solutions division.

=== DivX ===
Miloseski directed and lead design strategy for brand identity, creative, interactive design, and user experience for DivX, Inc. and its fortune 100 partner initiatives. As one of the early start-up members, he helped establish the global design strategy for the company – helping to lead DivX to hundreds of millions of users and its IPO in 2006.

=== Google ===
Miloseski was hired by the global internet search company Google based in the San Francisco Bay Area. As an early design and user experience leader at the company, Miloseski joined Google in 2007 and managed the design teams responsible for launching the end-to-end experiences for products such as Gmail, Google Calendar, Google Reader, Google Docs, and Google Spreadsheets.

Miloseski later had a strong focus on special projects at Google and served as the head of design for confidential platform efforts at the company. During this time, he was a design, research, and user experience leader across YouTube, Google TV, and Chromecast projects. Miloseski was awarded the OC Award by top executives and the exclusive Founder's Award by Larry Page and Sergey Brin for his outstanding contributions to innovation at Google.

=== Samsung ===
As global vice president, head of studio at Samsung Design America and head of Samsung's Mobile Experience Lab (UXCA), Miloseski led the design and development of products within the mobile, home IOT, and Software and Services ecosystem for Samsung Electronics. Miloseski's responsibility was to lead the design operation in North America, usher new innovative ways of working, build teams and an organizations that would position Samsung as an industry first-mover, define new categories of businesses for Samsung, and bring innovative new products to market. Miloseski developed and launched a range of mobile and wearable tech products, including the Samsung Gear IconX, Samsung Gear IconX, Samsung Galaxy Buds, Samsung Gear Fit 1, Samsung Gear Fit 2, Samsung Galaxy View, Samsung Gear S, Samsung Gear S2, Samsung Gear Circle, and the Samsung Level headphones lineup which includes Samsung Level-over headphones, Samsung Level-on headphones, and Samsung Level-in earbuds.

=== Palm ===
Miloseski, along with co-founder Howard Nuk, relaunched the Palm brand, which announced its first device, also called "Palm" on October 15, 2018. Miloseski and Nuk co-founded the San Francisco-based startup Palm Ventures Group which was incorporated on December 19, 2016. Miloseski and Nuk secured global exclusive rights to the original Palm brand, made famous in the mid-'90s from the launch of the PalmPilot from TCL Corporation, who had purchased the Palm brand assets from Hewlett-Packard in 2014.

The product Miloseski and Nuk created is a credit card-sized smartphone that features a 3.3-inch HD display, two cameras, and IP68 water and dust resistance. "The design is undeniably cute and sleek. The user interface is simple, and the raison d’être is well thought out."

In 2017, Miloseski and Nuk approached the San Francisco Bay Area-based basketball icon Stephen Curry to invest in Palm. Like his Warriors teammates Andre Iguodala and Kevin Durant, Curry has strong ties to the Silicon Valley startup ecosystem. According to Curry, he still associated the Palm brand with the PalmPilot his father Dell Curry had carried years ago and the games he had played on it as a child. Once Curry learned about the new device and its ambitions, he found it so intriguing that he “From the jump, I fell in love with [it],” Curry remembers.

Miloseski and Nuk launched the Palm phone on November 2, 2018, exclusively at Verizon. Since its launch, the Palm phone has sold globally through retail partners in over 12 countries, including US, UK, Spain, Germany China, Japan, and Ukraine.

== Awards and Publications ==
As an industry speaker, he has given keynote addresses at venues such as CES, GigaOM Mobilize, Engadget Expand, IPTV World, and Fast.Co Innovation. Throughout his career, Miloseski has been accredited with creating dozens of award-winning products—iF Award, Red Dot, IDSA, Good Design with numerous patents awarded to his name.
