= TCL 10 Pro =

Android Smartphone

- Brand: TCL
- Manufacturer: TCL Technology
- First released: 19 May 2020; 6 years ago
- Dimensions: 158.5 x 72.4 x 9.2 mm (6.24 x 2.85 x 0.36 in)
- Weight: 177 g (6 oz)
- Operating system: Android 10, TCL UI
- System-on-chip: Qualcomm Snapdragon 675
- CPU: Octa-core CPU (2 x 2.0 GHz Kryo 460 Gold, 6 x 1.7 GHz Kryo 460 Silver)
- GPU: Adreno 612
- Memory: 6 GB RAM
- Storage: 128 GB
- Removable storage: microSD card support up to 256GB
- Battery: 4500 mAh Li-Po non-removable battery
- Rear camera: Quad camera setup: 64-megapixel main camera (f/1.8); 16-megapixel wide-angle camera (f/2.4); 5-megapixel macro camera (f/2.2); 2-megapixel depth sensor (f/1.8)
- Front camera: 24 MP (f/2.0)
- Display: 6.47 in FHD+ AMOLED; 1080 x 2340 pixels resolution, 19.5:9 aspect ratio
- Sound: 3.5 mm audio jack, loudspeaker
- Website: Official website

The TCL 10 Pro is an Android-based smartphone manufactured by TCL. It was announced on 6 April 2020. It is available in two colors: Forest Mist Green and Ember Gray.

== Specifications ==
=== Hardware ===
TCL 10 Pro is powered by Qualcomm Snapdragon 675 system-on-chip with Adreno 612 GPU. It is equipped with accelerometer, gyroscope, IR sensor, proximity sensor and RGB light sensors.

==== Memory and storage ====
TCL 10 Pro has 6 GB of RAM and 128 GB of internal storage. It has a dedicated microSD card slot which supports up to 256 GB of additional storage.

==== Display ====
TCL 10 Pro has a 6.47 inch AMOLED capacitive display with 1080 x 2340 pixels (FHD+) resolution, 398 ppi (pixels per inch) pixel density and 93% screen to body ratio.

==== Camera ====
TCL 10 Pro has dual LED flash and a four camera setup at the back with a 64-megapixel main camera with f/1.89 aperture; a 16-megapixel wide-angle camera with f/2.4 aperture; a 5-megapixel macro camera with f/2.2 aperture and a 2-megapixel depth sensor with f/1.8 aperture. It has contrast detection autofocus, laser detection autofocus and phase-detection autofocus with 10X hybrid digital zoom. The front facing camera is a 24-megapixel sensor with f/2.0 aperture.

==== Battery ====
TCL 10 Pro features a non-removable 4500 mAh Li-Po battery. It has Quick Charge 3.0 18W (9V/2A) fast charging, it can charge 50% in 35 minutes.

=== Software ===
TCL 10 Pro runs on Android 10 mobile operating system and TCL UI user interface.
