= Nxtpaper =

Display technology

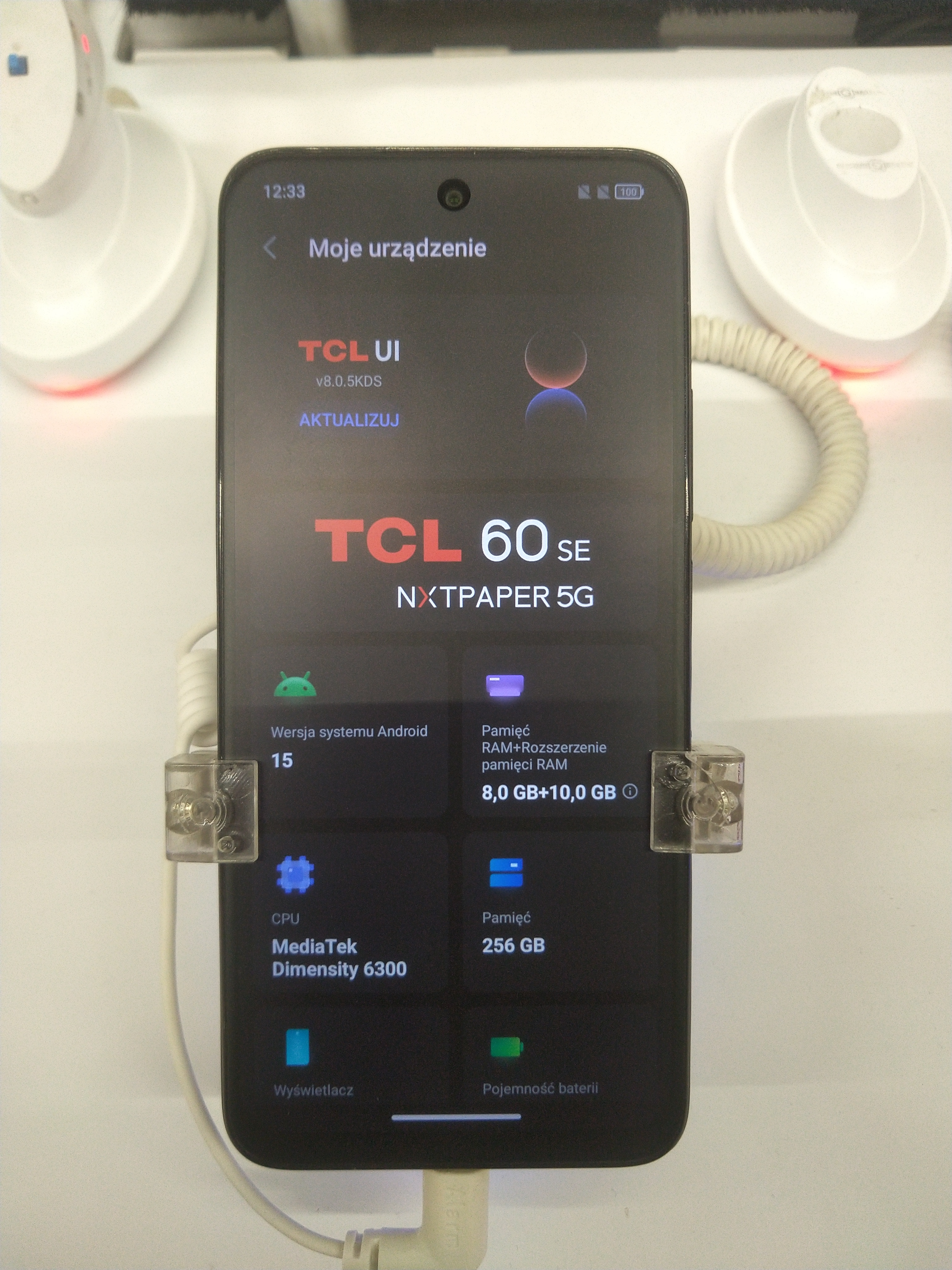
TCL 60 SE NXTPAPER 5G

TCL NXTPAPER is a display technology developed by TCL Corporation that attempts to replicate the experience of reading on paper to improve eye comfort. TCL claims that the NXTPAPER technology reduces blue light emissions, which are often linked to digital eye strain and sleep disturbances. It also includes anti-glare properties, designed to make screen reading more akin to reading paper, further reducing strain on the eyes.

TCL has implemented NXTPAPER technology in various products, including tablets and smartphones.

Devices featuring NXTPAPER displays include:

Notebooks (Windows 11):

- TCL Book X12 Go

Tablets:

- TCL NXTPAPER 10s
- TLC NXTPAPER 11, 11 Plus, and 11 Gen 2
- TCL NXTPAPER 14
- TCL Note A1 NXTPaper - Launched in 2026, is a ReMarkable competitor priced at $549

Phones:

- TCL 40 NXTPAPER
- TCL 50 NXTPAPER 5G
- TCL 50 XL NXTPAPER 5G
- TCL 60 XE NXTPAPER 5G - TCL's only phone released in the US in 2025.
- TCL NXTPAPER 70 Pro - $200 in the US.
- TCL NXTPAPER 60 Ultra - launched in late 2025, features a 7"2 nxtpaper screen as well as a magnetic EMR pen and cover.
- TCL P80 Pro/Ultra

NXTPAPER technology generations:

- NXTPAPER 1(2021)
- NXTPAPER 2(2023-2024)
- NXTPAPER 3(2024-2025)
- NXTPAPER 4(2025-2026)
