= Schneider Rundfunkwerke =

German manufacturer of audio equipment

Schneider Rundfunkwerke AG
- Industry: Audio
- Founded: 1889
- Defunct: 2002
- Headquarters: Türkheim, Germany

Schneider Rundfunkwerke AG was a German manufacturer of mass market audio equipment.

== History ==
The origins of the company trace to 1889 in Türkheim, Bavaria, Germany, when Felix Schneider founded a company manufacturing industrial woodworking tools. In 1965 the business entered the audio electronics market through the manufacture of radio cabinets

During the 1970s and 1980s the Schneider name became associated with audio systems; the company was unusual for a German audio systems manufacturer in that it focused on low cost products rather than the luxury sector.

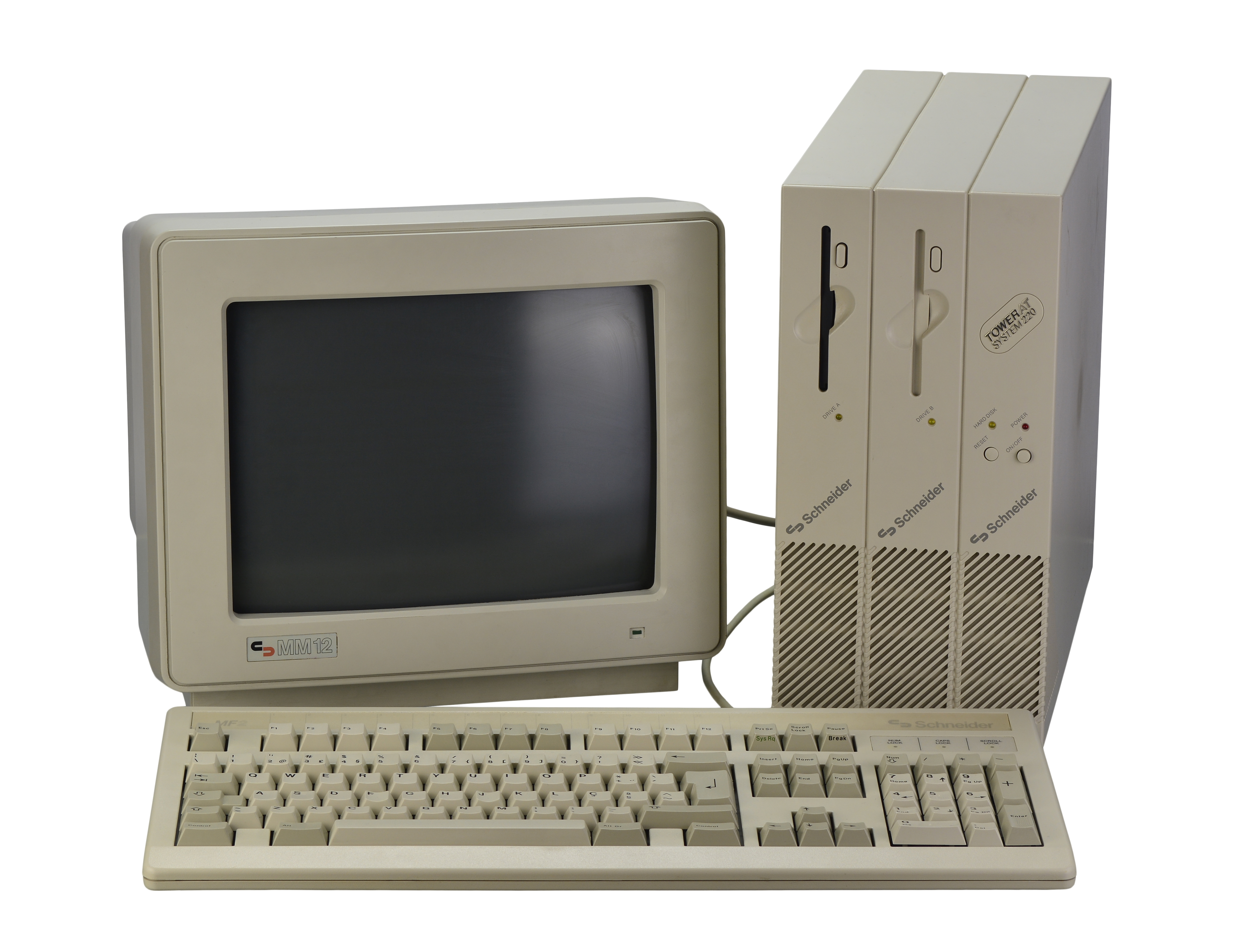
Tower AT System 220, with M12 monitor and MF2 keyboard, released in 1988

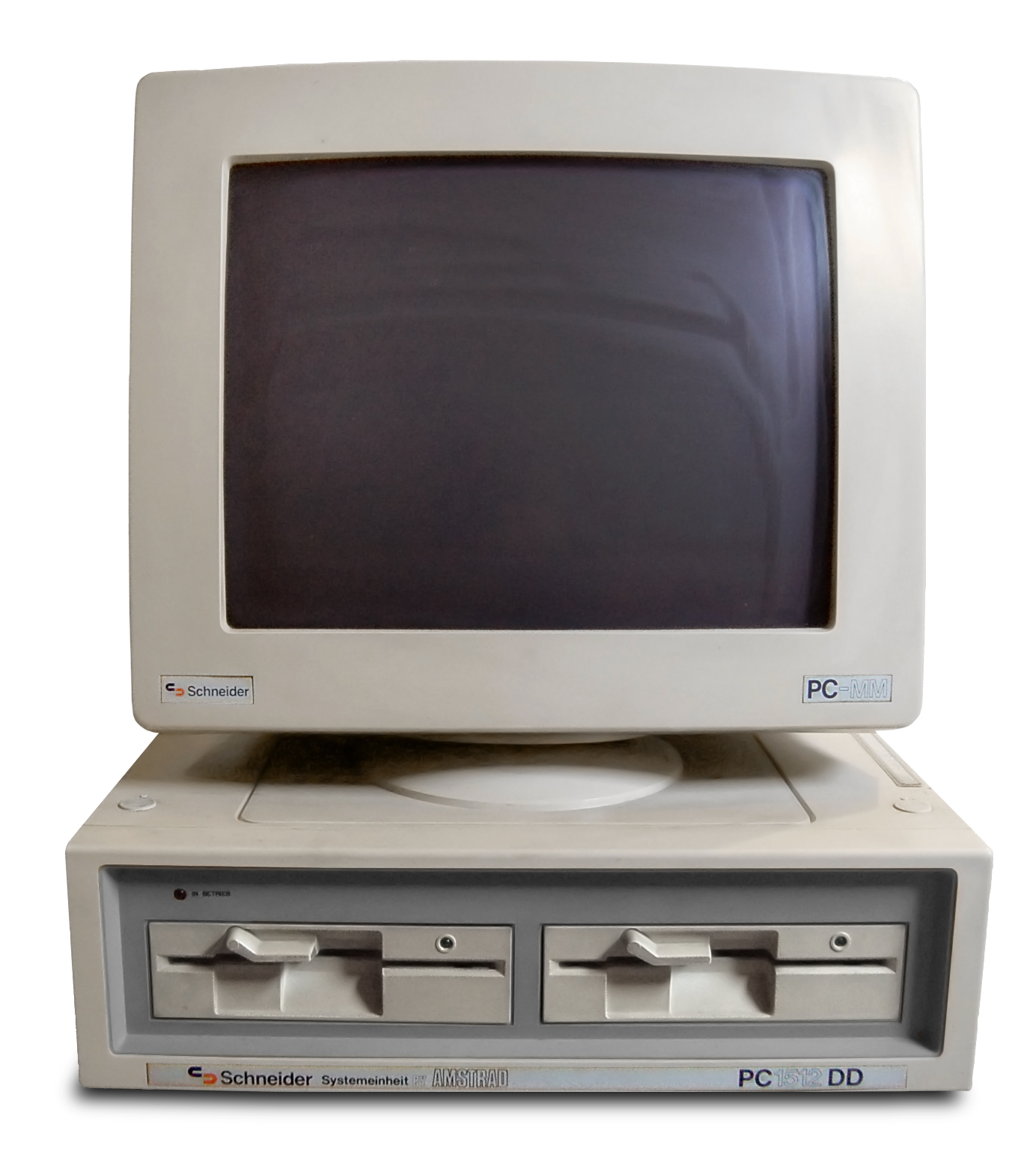
Schneider-badged version of the Amstrad 1512 DD

In 1984 computers from the Amstrad company were marketed under the Schneider brand in Germany and central Europe. Schneider sold the Amstrad CPC 464, Amstrad PCW and Schneider Joyce, followed by the Amstrad PC1512 and PC1640.

In 1987 the association with Amstrad ended, and the company produced PC compatible machines from 1988, like the Schneider Euro PC.

The Gebrüder Steidinger company (maker of the Dual turntable line) and brand were acquired from Thomson in 1988, in part to obtain a saleable brand name in France where the large and long established company Schneider SA was already present. In the 1990s the company's name was changed to Schneider Electric

In 2002 the company was bankrupt. It was acquired by the TCL Corporation for €8.2 million in 2002.

== See also ==
- Schneider Computer Division
- Schneider Euro PC
