= Wiko =

French phone manufacturer

WIKO
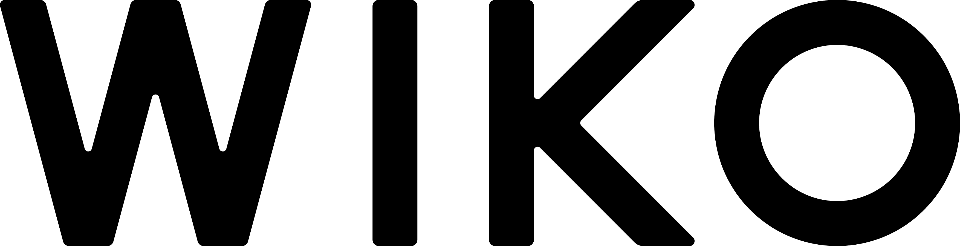
- Industry: Wholesale (intercompany trade) of electronic and telecommunications equipment and parts
- Founded: 3 February 2011
- Headquarters: London, United Kingdom
- Area served: France; Africa; Caribbean; Central America; Middle East; Southeast Asia; Bangladesh; Belgium; Croatia; Czech Republic; Denmark; Finland; Greece; Hungary; India; Italy; Norway; Pakistan; Poland; Portugal; Romania; Serbia; Slovakia; Slovenia; Spain; Sri Lanka; Sweden; Switzerland; Turkey; Thailand; United Kingdom
- Key people: Laurent Dahan
- Parent: Tinno Mobile
- Website: wikomobile.com

WIKO (/ˈwɪkoʊ/ WIK-oh) is a French company, and a fully owned subsidiary of Chinese mobile phone manufacturer Tinno Mobile.

== History ==
Wiko was established in February 2011, by French businessman Laurent Dahan. Its head office, design and marketing teams are based in Marseille, France.

Wiko shipped 2.6 million devices overall in 2013, mostly dual-SIM Android smartphones. That year, it sold 1.7 million smartphones in France, i.e. 7 % of the French market and it was the country's second largest selling smartphone firm after Samsung.

In 2014 Wiko entered the British market.

In 2018 Wiko was present in more than 30 countries in Europe, Asia, the Middle East, and Africa, and had around 30 million users, twice the number of two years earlier.

== Privacy data collection ==
In November 2017, it is revealed that pre-installed application within phones from Wiko (a Tinno Mobile subsidiary) would transmit technical data monthly to Tinno without customer consent. The company confirmed the existence of such information collection system and said updated version of those applications will no longer collect geographical information of devices.

== Remote shut down ==
A vulnerability was identified that allows anyone to remotely shut down a phone using a "=" text message, the flaw could be in hardware, rather than software.

== See also ==
- BQ (company)
