= TCL Electronics =

Chinese electronics company

TCL Electronics Holdings Limited
- Formerly: TCL International Holdings; TCL Multimedia Technology Holdings
- Type: Public
- Traded as: SEHK: 1070
- Founded: 26 November 1999; 26 years ago
- Headquarters: Hong Kong, China; Cayman Islands (registered office)
- Area served: Worldwide
- Key people: Li Dongsheng (Chairman); Wang Cheng (CEO)
- Revenue: 46,990,000,000 Hong Kong dollar (2019)
- Parent: TCL Industries Holdings

Chinese name
- Simplified Chinese: TCL 电子控股有限公司
- Traditional Chinese: TCL 電子控股有限公司
Transcriptions

Alternative Chinese name
- Simplified Chinese: TCL 电子
- Traditional Chinese: TCL 電子
Transcriptions

TCL Electronics Holdings Limited, formerly known as TCL Multimedia Technology Holdings Limited, is a Chinese multinational corporation headquartered and listed in Hong Kong, but incorporated in the Grand Cayman, the Cayman Islands. It specializes in the research and development (R&D), manufacturing and distribution of products including televisions, mobile phones, air conditioners, washing machines, refrigerators and smart home internet services. It is a subsidiary of TCL Industries Holdings, a company which itself is a subsidiary of TCL Technology.

== History ==
TCL began its international expansion in 1999 with entry into Vietnam and a listing on the Hong Kong Stock Exchange. In the early 2000s, it grew through acquisitions and partnerships, including Schneider Electric (Germany) in 2002 and a joint venture with France’s Thomson in 2003. By 2005, TCL had become the world’s top-selling color TV brand.

Through the late 2000s and early 2010s, TCL won global recognition with partnerships with IKEA (2012) and IMAX Corporation (2013), and consistent top-three global TV market share. Its partnership with Roku and the acquisition of Sanyo’s Mexico factory helped strengthen its North American presence.

From 2015 to 2018, TCL expanded further with joint ventures in Brazil and Argentina, new product lines like Thunderbird TV, and high-profile branding moves including Neymar as global ambassador. By 2018, it was the #2 TV maker worldwide.

In recent years, TCL launched its first branded smartphone (2020) and deepened global sports sponsorships with FIBA, Conmebol, and the Copa América. In 2025, it signed a landmark deal with the International Olympic Committee to become a TOP global sponsor until 2032.

In 2025, TCL Electronics launched its TCL SunPower Global unit.

== Main business distribution ==
TCL has set up production and marketing systems in dozens of countries and regions worldwide. It manages seven global R&D centers, 17 manufacturing bases, and 40,000 sales outlets. The company has four supply chains: product design and manufacturing, logistics and supply, quality assurance, and product creation and support. in 2025 China based electronics brand TCL eyes to double TV market share this year at 10 per cent.

== Lawsuits ==
In December 2025, Texas Attorney General Ken Paxton filed a lawsuit against TCL and four other smart TV manufacturers, alleging that the companies were illegally "spying on Texans by secretly recording what consumers watch in their own homes" using automated content recognition (ACR) technology.
