= Schneider Euro PC =

IBM PC compatible home computer system

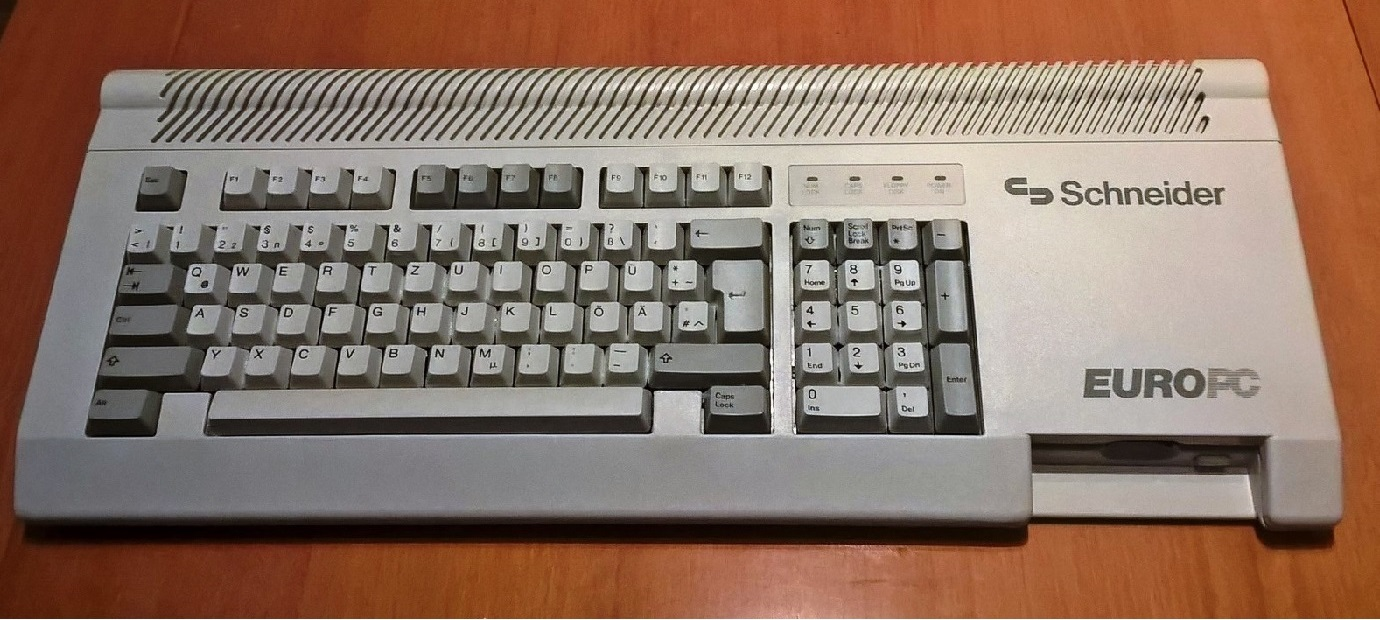
- Manufacturer: Schneider
- Type: Personal Computer
- Released: 14 August 1988; 37 years ago
- Introductory price: 1,800 DEM
- Operating system: MS-DOS 3.3, GW-BASIC, Microsoft Works
- CPU: Siemens 8088 @ 4.77 to 9.54 MHz
- Memory: 512 KB (expandable to 640 KB)
- Storage: 3 1/2-inch floppy disk drive (720 KB)
- Display: 12" amber monochrome monitor (MM12) or 14" color monitor (CM14)
- Graphics: Hercules, CGA
- Successor: Euro PC II, EURO XT, Euro AT, Euro SX

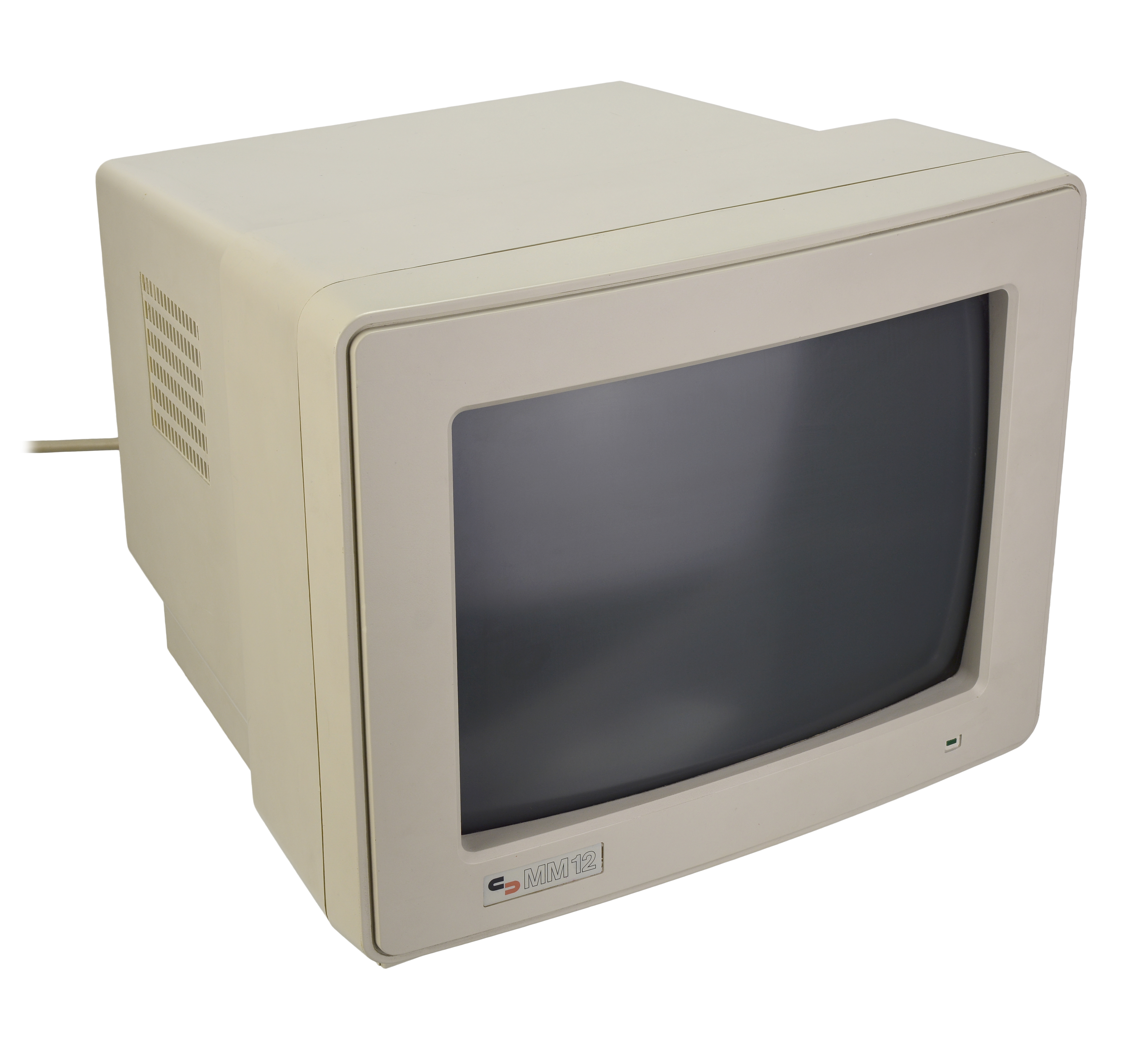
Schneider MM12 Monochrome Monitor

The Schneider Euro PC was a PC compatible home computer, introduced in 1988 by the Schneider Computer Division.

A follow-up to the success of the Schneider CPC series, the Euro PC offered an inexpensive entry into the emerging market for home PCs. The computer used a Siemens 8088 processor (clocked at 4.77, 7.15 or 9.54 MHz according to a BIOS setting or key combination), had 512 KB of RAM (expandable to 640 KB), and was shipped with MS-DOS 3.3 and Microsoft Works 1.0.

As with many other home computers of its time, the computer circuit board was built into the keyboard housing. A 12" amber monochrome monitor (MM12) and a 14" color monitor (CM14) were available for the system. The Euro PC had a graphics chip that could be switched between monochrome Hercules and color CGA modes. The power supply was external, an unusual feature for a PC.

A 3 1/2-inch floppy disk drive (720 KB) was installed as a mass storage device. An external 3 1/2-inch floppy disk drive with 720 KB (FD720), a 5 1/4-inch floppy disk drive with 360 KB (FD360), and a 20 MB hard disk (XT Attachment, similar to IDE / ATA ) were available as accessories. This could not be replaced by any other model, as the drive parameters were permanently programmed into the BIOS. However, it was possible to operate other hard drives with a corresponding controller in the expansion slot.

The computer was sold through large mail-order companies at a price of 1,800 DEM. The highly competitive PC market left little room for new machines, but the Euro PC was still sold in considerable numbers thanks to its very low price and slim, home computer-like appearance.

An updated version, the Euro PC II introduced in 1989, had 768 KB RAM and a 8087 mathematical coprocessor. Another version with further expansions was called EURO XT. The Euro AT offered a 80286 processor, 1 MB of RAM, and a EGA graphics card. The Euro SX, introduced in 1992, came with a 80386SX processor.

== Technical details ==
Schneider Euro PC Series
		Euro PC	Euro PC II	Euro XT	Euro AT	Euro SX
CPU		8088			80286	80386SX
Max. Speed		9,54 MHz			12 MHz	20 MHz
Standard Speed		7,17/4,77 MHz			6 MHz	
Wait-State		–			0	
Coprocessor (optional)		–	8087		80287	80387SX
Expandable in motherboard	RAM	512 KB	512 KB* expandable 768 KB	640 KB + 128 KB RAM-Disk	1 MB	4 MB
Expandable in motherboard	Disk Drives	–	768 KB*	–		
Expandable in motherboard	Expandable in system	–			16 MB	
Expandable in motherboard	ROM	32 KB BIOS with Setup			64 KB Phoenix-BIOS with Setup	
Expandable in motherboard	Disk drives	1 × 3,5 "				
Expandable in motherboard	Size	720 KB			1,44 MB	
Expandable in motherboard	Hard drives	optional external (HD20)		internal	internal (Seagate ST-142A)	internal
Expandable in motherboard	Size	–		21 MB	42 MB	
Expandable in motherboard	Speed	–		157 kbit/s	664 kbit/s	
Expandable in motherboard	Access time	–		68 ms	28 ms	
Expandable in motherboard	Interleave	–			1:1	
Expandable in motherboard	Video board	Hercules, CGA			EGA, CGA and Hercules compatible	VGA
Expandable in motherboard	Video Memory	64 KB			256 KB RAM, 32 KB EGA BIOS	
Graphic modes	720 × 348	720 × 348, monochrome				
Graphic modes	CGA	320 × 200, 4 colors, 16 colors			320 × 200, 4 colors	
Graphic modes	CGA	640 × 200, 2 colors, 4 colors			640 × 200 monochrome	
Graphic modes	EGA	–			640 × 350, 16 from 64 colors	
Graphic modes	Schneider HI-RES Graphics	–			640 × 480, 16 from 64 colors	
Graphic modes	Schneider HI-RES Graphics	–			752 × 420, 16 from 64 colors	
Graphic modes	Schneider HI-RES Graphics	–			800 × 600, 16 from 64 colors	
Graphic modes	Text (16 colors)	40 Columns × 25 Lines				
Graphic modes	Text (16 colors)	80 Columns × 25 Lines				
Graphic modes	Text (16 colors)				80 Columns × 21 or 43 Lines	
Graphic modes	Text (16 colors)				100 Columns × 37 or 75 Lines	
Graphic modes	Text (16 colors)				120 Columns × 21 or 43 Lines	
Graphic modes	Text (16 colors)				132 Columns × 21 or 32 Lines	
Graphic modes	Optional graphics	EGA/VGA		EGA, VGA, SVGA with EURO-VGA board	VGA, SVGA with EURO-VGA board	VGA
Interfaces	Serial (RS-232)	1				
Interfaces	Parallel	1				
Interfaces	Mouse/Joystick	1				
Interfaces	External disc drives	1				
Interfaces	External hard drives	1		–		
Interfaces	Expansion slots					
Interfaces	Total	1		3		
Interfaces	8 Bit	1		2	1	
Interfaces	16 Bit				1	
Interfaces	Schneider Expansion Port			1	1	
Optional drive expansions	FD1200T	–			5,25" disc drive with 1,2 MB	
Optional drive expansions	FD360	5,25" disc drive with 360 KB				
Optional drive expansions	FD720	3,5" disc drive with 720 KB				
Optional drive expansions	HD 20	20MB hard drive	21MB hard drive			
Optional drive expansions	STS40				Tape drive with 40 MB capacity	
Keyboard		86 Keys, QWERTZ		MF2 compatible, 102 Keys, QWERTZ		
Operating system		MS-DOS 3.3, GW-BASIC, MS-WORKS		MS-DOS 3.3, GW-BASIC		
Monitor		MM12 (Hercules), CM14 (CGA)			MM12 (Hercules, EGA monochrome), CM14 (CGA), EM14 (EGA, CGA), MS14 (Multiscan)	

== See also ==
- PC AT
- Sinclair PC200
