= Tinno Mobile =

Chinese mobile phone manufacturer

Tinno Mobile logo

Tinno Mobile is a Chinese ODM company focused on making phones for other brands. The company have also created their own mobile phone brands like Sugar Phone, and Wiko Mobile. The company was established in 2005 and is headquartered at Shenzhen, Guangdong, China.

Tinno Mobile products are sold in more than 80 countries around the world. In 2020 Tinno shipped more than 28.7 million mobile phones and tablets worldwide. The localized model of sub-branding have been praised by Wang Yang in 2014 when he was Vice Premier of China at the time, saying they are a good example for "Ethnical (Chinese) Companies" to enter international market. The company said they have an annual revenue of 1 billion euro.

== Scandals ==
=== Privacy data collection ===
In December 2016, it is revealed that pre-installed application developed by Adups within BLU phones would transmit user data to Chinese server without customer consent. Tinno is among the list of brands that were found to have Adups applications pre-installed on their phones.

In November 2017, it is revealed that pre-installed application within Wiko phones, a Tinno subsidiary, would transmit technical data monthly to Tinno without customer consent. The company confirmed the existence of such information collection system, and said updated version of those applications will no longer collect geographical information of devices.
