= TCL Technology =

Chinese multinational electronics company

Telecom Communications Limited Technology Group Corp.

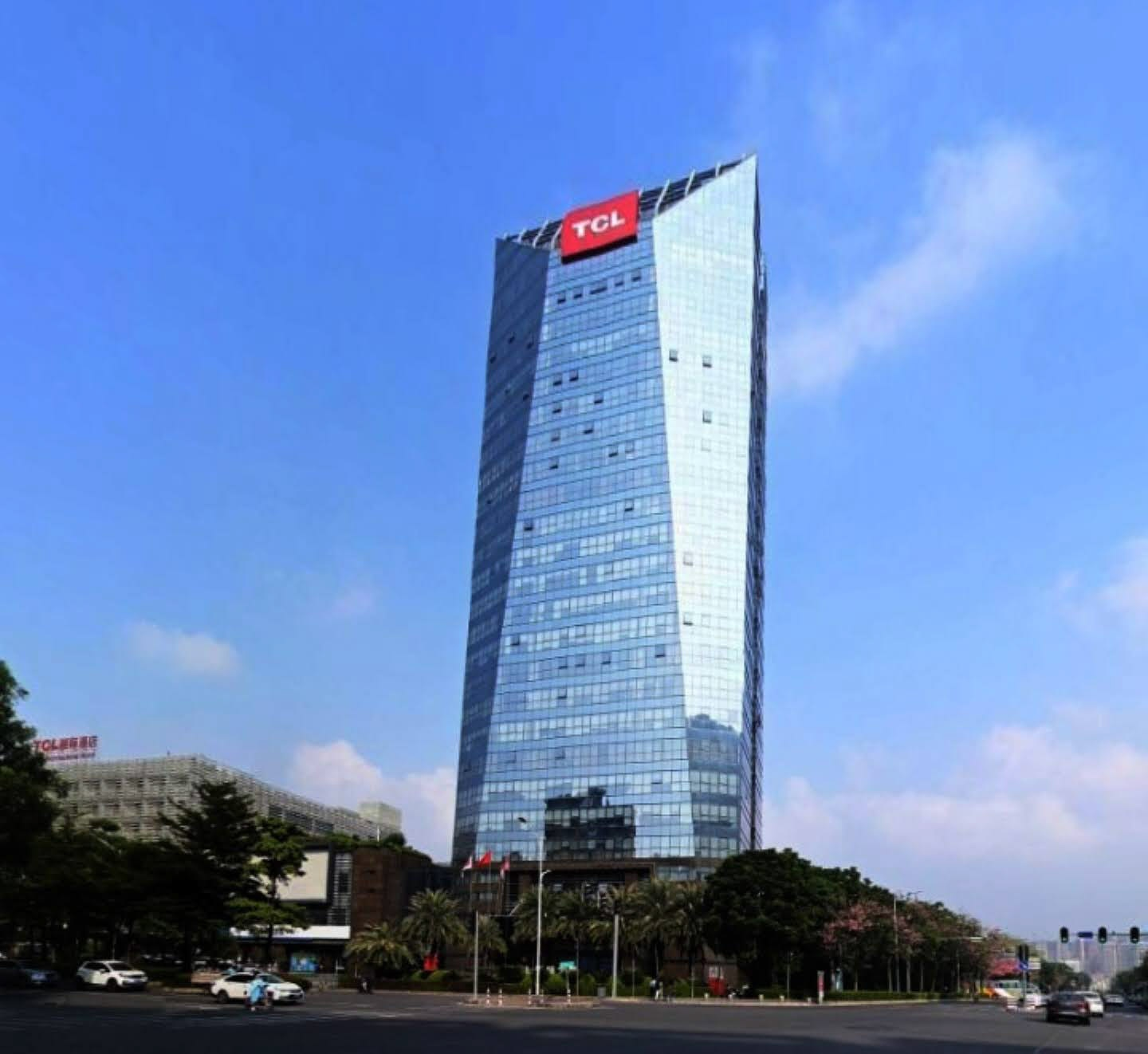
- Headquarters in 2021
- Native name: TCL科技集团股份有限公司
- Romanized name: TCL kējì jítuán gǔfèn yǒuxiàn gōngsī
- Type: Public; partly state-owned enterprise
- Traded as: SZSE: 000100; CSI A100
- ISIN: CNE000001GL8
- Industry: Consumer electronics Home appliances Finance
- Founded: 1981; 45 years ago (as TTK); 1985; 41 years ago (as TCL Corporation); 7 February 2020; 6 years ago (as TCL Technology)
- Founder: Li Dongsheng (李东生) and Luca Situ (司徒立生)
- Headquarters: Huizhou, Guangdong, China
- Area served: Worldwide
- Key people: Li Dongsheng (CEO)
- Products: Television sets, mobile phones, air conditioning, washing machines, refrigerators, robot vacuum cleaners
- Revenue: ▲US$20.895 billion (2024)
- Operating income: ▲US$3.691 billion (2024)
- Net income: ▲US$0.687 billion (2024)
- Total assets: ▲US$19.279 billion (2024)
- Total equity: ▲US$3.328 billion (2024)
- Number of employees: 35,379 (2019)
- Subsidiaries: TCL Electronics (52.10%); TCL Communication; China Display; Tonly Electronics Holdings Limited; BlackBerry Mobile (discontinued); Alcatel Mobile (under license); Palm; iFFALCON/FFALCON Bravia (brand) (51.0%)

Chinese name
- Simplified Chinese: TCL科技集团
- Traditional Chinese: TCL科技集團
Transcriptions
Standard Mandarin
- Hanyu Pinyin: TCL Kējì Jítuán
- Website: tcl.com

TCL Technology Group Corp. (an abbreviation for Telephone Communications Limited), claimed to be an abbreviation for The Creative Life, is a Chinese partially state-owned electronics company headquartered in Huizhou, Guangdong province. TCL develops, manufactures, and sells consumer electronics like television sets, mobile phones, air conditioners, washing machines, refrigerators, and small electrical appliances. In 2010, it was the world's 25th-largest consumer electronics producer. On 7 February 2020, TCL Corporation changed its name to TCL Technology. It was the second-largest television manufacturer by market share in 2022 and 2023.

TCL comprises five listed companies: TCL Technology, listed on the Shenzhen Stock Exchange (SZSE: 000100), TCL Electronics Holdings, Ltd. (SEHK: 1070), TCL Communication Technology Holdings, Ltd. (former code SEHK: 2618; delisted in 2016), China Display Optoelectronics Technology Holdings Ltd. (SEHK: 334), and Tonly Electronics Holdings Ltd. (SEHK: 1249), listed on the Hong Kong Stock Exchange.

== History ==
The company was founded in 1981 by two close friends, Tomson Li Dongsheng and Luca Situ, under the brand name TTK as an audio cassette manufacturer.

In 1985, after being sued by Japanese cassette manufacturer TDK for intellectual property violation, the company changed its brand name to TCL by taking the initials from Telephone Communcations Limited.

In 1999, TCL entered the Vietnamese market.

On 19 September 2002, TCL announced the acquisition of all consumer electronics-related assets of the former German company Schneider Rundfunkwerke, including the right to use its trademarks as Schneider, Dual, Albona, Joyce and Logix.

In July 2003, TCL chairman Li Dongsheng formally announced a "Dragon and Tiger Plan" to establish two competitive TCL businesses in global markets ("Dragons") and three leading businesses inside China ("Tigers").

In November 2003, TCL and Thomson SA of France (now part of Vantiva) announced the creation of a joint venture to produce televisions and DVD players worldwide. TCL took a 67 percent stake in the joint venture, with Thomson SA holding the rest of the shares, and it was agreed that televisions made by TCL-Thomson would be marketed under the TCL brand in Asia, and the Thomson and RCA brands in Europe and North America.

In April 2004, TCL and Alcatel announced the creation of a mobile phone manufacturing joint venture: Alcatel Mobile. TCL injected 55 million euros in the venture in return for a 55 per cent shareholding.

In April 2005, TCL closed its manufacturing plant in Türkheim, Bavaria, laying off 120 former Schneider employees.

In May 2005, TCL announced that its Hong Kong-listed unit would acquire Alcatel's 45 per cent stake in their mobile-phone joint venture for consideration of HK$63.34 million ($8.1 million) worth of TCL Communication shares.

In June 2007, TCL announced that its mobile phone division planned to cease using the Alcatel brand and switch entirely to the TCL brand within five years.

In April 2008, Samsung Electronics announced that it would be outsourcing the production of some LCD TV modules to TCL.

In July 2008, TCL announced that it planned to raise 1.7 billion yuan ($249 million) via a share placement on the Shenzhen Stock Exchange to fund the construction of two production lines for LCD televisions; one for screens of up to 42 inches, and the other for screens of up to 56 inches. TCL sold a total of 4.18 million LCD TV sets in 2008, more than triple the number during 2007.

In January 2009, TCL announced plans to double its LCD TV production capacity to 10 million units by the end of 2009.

In November 2009, TCL announced that it had formed a joint-venture with the Shenzhen government to construct an 8.5-generation thin film transistor-liquid crystal display production facility in the city at a cost of $3.9 billion.

In March 2010, TCL Electronics raised HK$525 million through the sale of shares on the Hong Kong Stock Exchange, in order to fund the development of its LCD and LED businesses and to generate working capital.

In May 2011, TCL launched the China Smart Multimedia Terminal Technology Association in partnership with Hisense Electric Co. and Sichuan Changhong Electric Co., with the aim of helping to establish industry standards for smart televisions.

In January 2013, TCL bought the naming rights for Grauman's Chinese Theatre for $5 million.

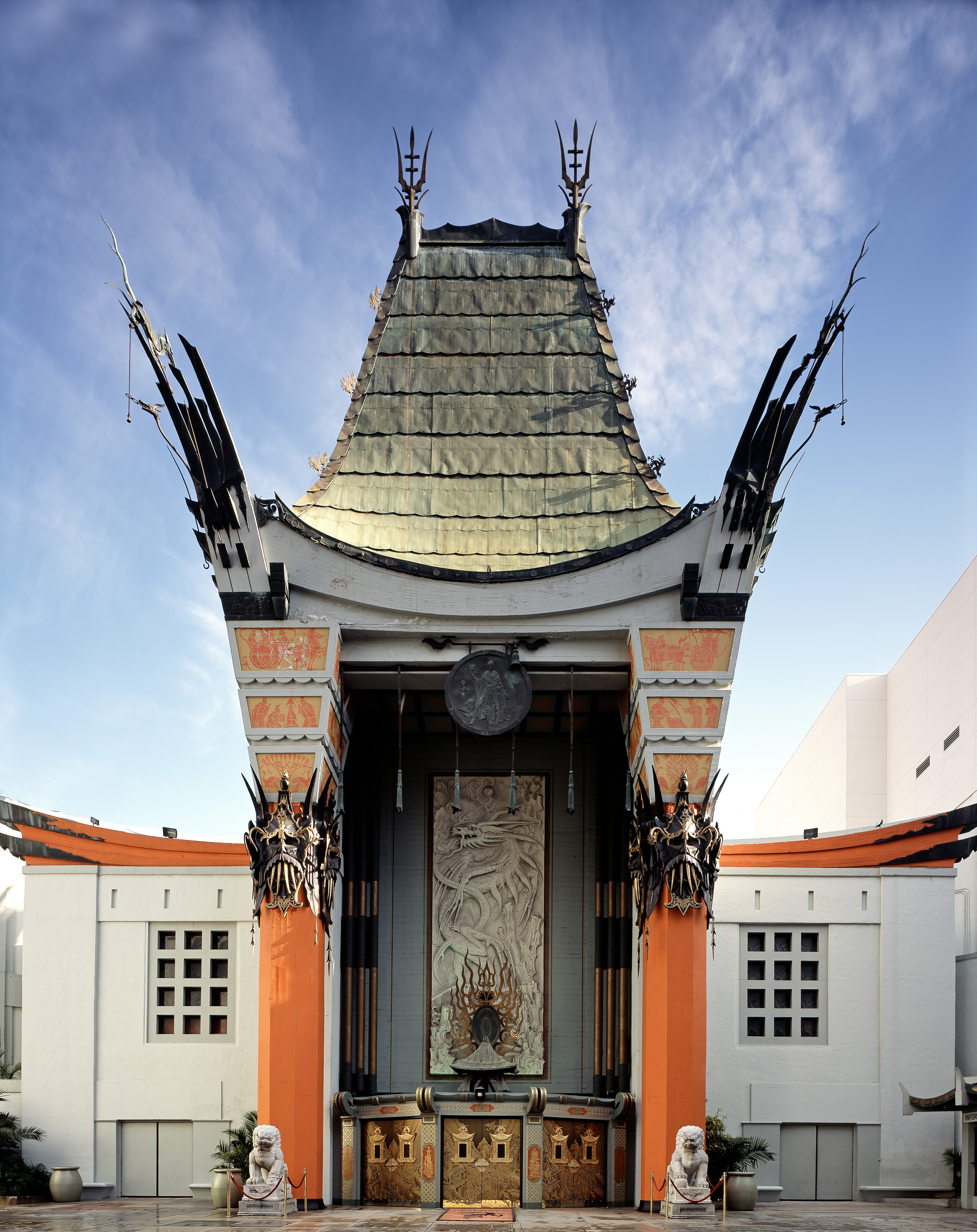
Grauman's Chinese Theatre, or TCL Chinese Theatre, at Hollywood, California

In 2014, TCL changed the meaning of its identifying initials from "Telephone Communication Limited" to a branding slogan, "The Creative Life", for commercial purposes.

In February 2014, TCL spent 280 million RMB to purchase 11 percent shareholdings of Tianjin 712 Communication & Broadcasting Co., Ltd, a Chinese military-owned company which produces communication devices and navigation systems for the Chinese army.

In August 2014, TCL partnered with Roku for use as TCL's primary smart TV platform. TCL Corporation and Tonly Electronics was implicated in bribing a government official in Guangdong province in exchange for government subsidies.

In October 2014, TCL acquired the Palm brand from HP for use on smartphones.

In 2016, TCL reached an agreement with BlackBerry Limited to produce smartphones under the BlackBerry brand, under BlackBerry Mobile. This deal ceased on 31 August 2020.

In 2019, due to restructuring, TCL completed the handover of major assets and was split into TCL Technology Group Corporation (TCL Technology) and TCL Industrial Holdings (TCL Industrials).

In 2020, TCL Technology acquired Samsung Display's assets in Suzhou, China, including a Gen 8.5 fab and a co-located LCD module plant.

In December 2025, Texas attorney general Ken Paxton filed a lawsuit against TCL, alleging that the company illegally collects and shares viewer data with the Chinese government.

On 20 January 2026, TCL and Sony entered a joint venture agreement, according to which TCL will hold 51% and Sony 49% of its shares.

== Operations ==
TCL is organized into five business divisions:

- Multimedia: TV sets
- Communications: cell phones and MIFI devices
- Home Appliances: AC units and laundry machines
- Home Electronics / Consumer Electronics: ODM products, like DVD, etc.
- Semiconductor Display and Materials: including China Star Optoelectronics Technology (CSOT), Guangdong Juhua Printing Display Technology Co., Ltd. and Guangzhou ChinaRay Optoelectronic Materials Co., Ltd.

In addition, it has four affiliated business areas covering real estate and investment, logistics services, online education services, and finance.

In 2021, TCL had 28 research and development (R&D) organizations, 10 joint laboratories, and 22 manufacturing bases. TCL Corporation also has its own research facility called TCL Corporate Research, which is located in Shenzhen, with the objective to research cutting-edge technology innovations for other subsidiaries.

== Technology ==
In 2020, TCL introduced an innovative display technology known as TCL NXTPAPER, characterized by its reduction of blue light and anti-glare capabilities, aimed at enhancing visual comfort.

== Products ==
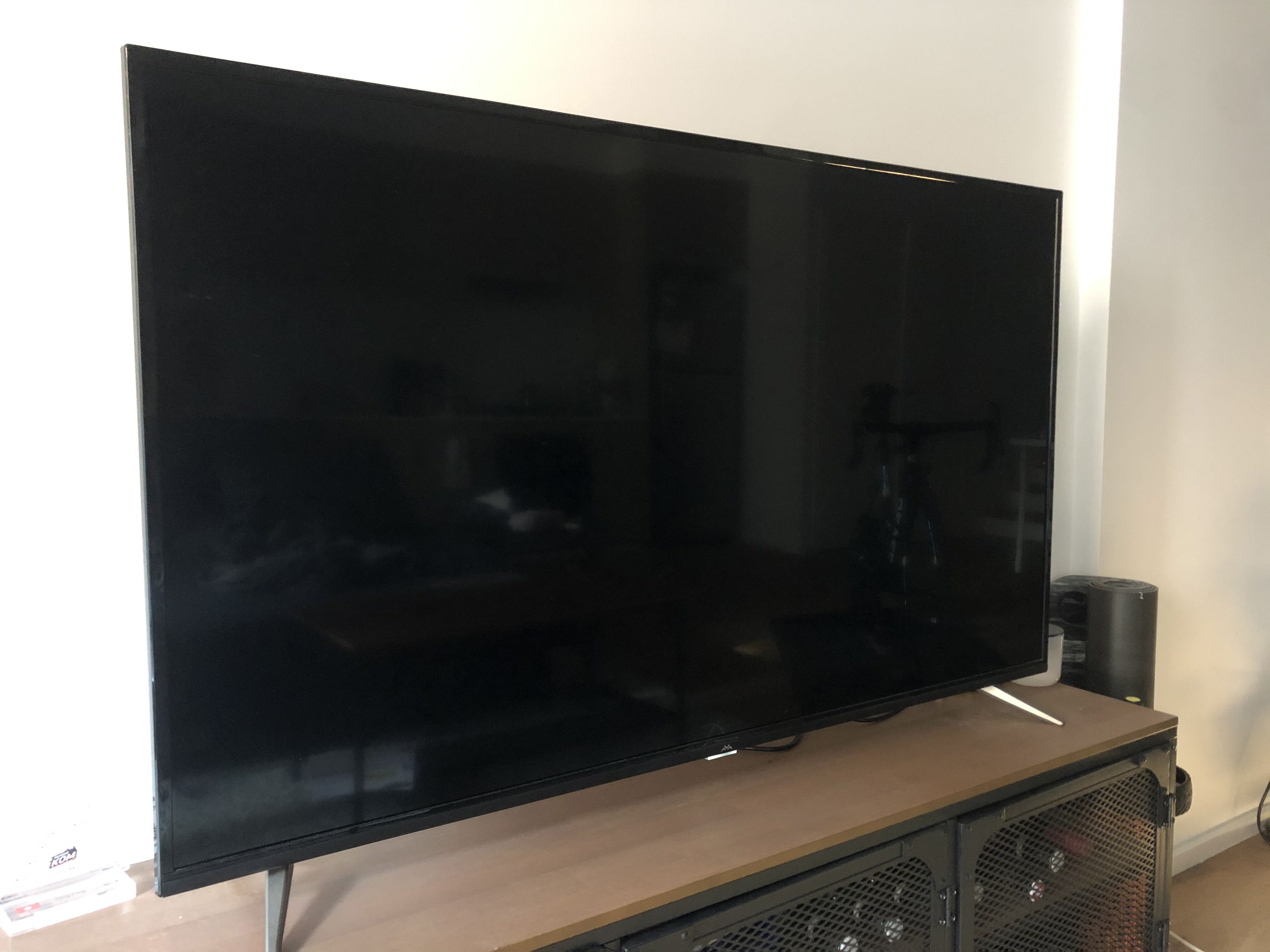
FFalcon Smart TV (TCL) 55"

TCL's primary products are TVs, DVD players, air conditioners, mobile phones, home appliances, electric lighting, and digital media. They also sell robot vacuum cleaners.

It primarily sells its products under the following brand names:

- TCL for TVs and air conditioners in Africa, Asia, Australasia, Europe, North America, South America, and Russia
- Alcatel Mobile and Thomson for mobile phones (global)
- RCA-branded electrical products in the United States
- Some Roku models in United States
- Beginning in 2019, JB Hi-Fi in Australia started selling a new line of budget Smart TV's under the brand name FFalcon, which are manufactured by TCL, and contain TCL firmware, software and components.

The company, as of April 2012, is in venture with Swedish furniture giant IKEA to provide the consumer electronics behind the Uppleva integrated HDTV and entertainment system product.

=== Smartphones ===
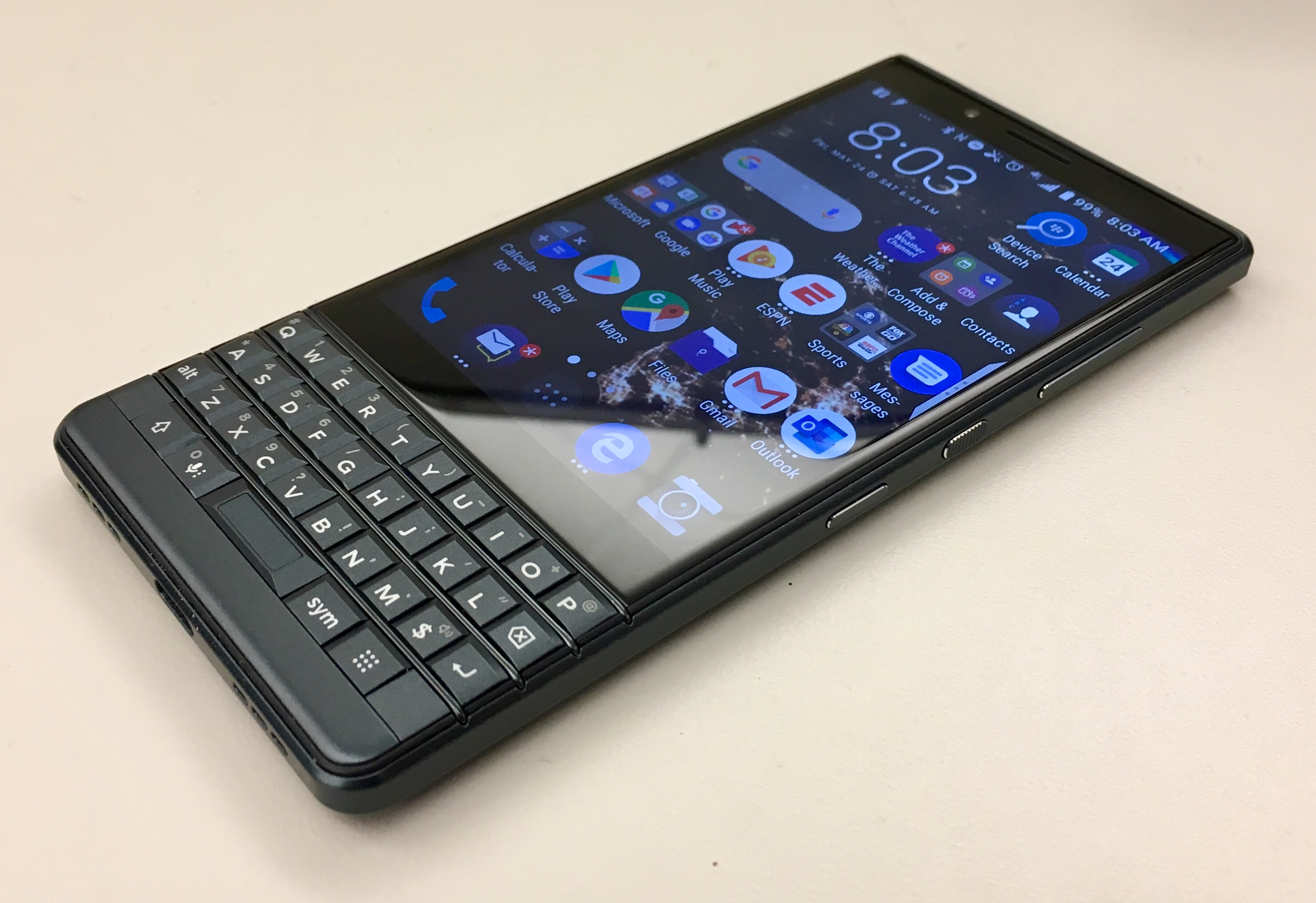
The BlackBerry Key2, introduced in 2018, incorporates the QWERTY keyboard associated with the BlackBerry brand.

In 2016, it contract manufactured the Blackberry DTEK for BlackBerry Limited, under their flagship BlackBerry brand. In December 2016, it became a licensee of the BlackBerry brand, to manufacture, distribute, and design devices for the global market. Until August 2020, it distributed BlackBerry devices under the name of BlackBerry Mobile.

TCL is also the owner of the Palm brand. The company launched the Palm "ultra-mobile companion" smartphone in 2018.

In late 2019, TCL released their first own-branded Android phone, called the TCL Plex.

TCL announced the 10 series for 2020, consisting of the TCL 10 SE, TCL 10L, TCL 10 Pro, TCL 10 Plus and TCL 10 5G.

TCL phone models and specs
Model	Display type	Display size	Resolution	Release date	System on chip	GPU	RAM	User memory	Rear camera	Front camera	Battery												
Model	Display type	Display size	Resolution	Release date	System on chip	GPU	RAM	User memory	Rear camera	Front camera	Battery	TCL Plex	IPS LCD	6.53"	Full HD+ 1080×2340	2019.10	Qualcomm Snapdragon 675	Adreno 612	6 GB	128 GB	48 MP; 16 MP; 2 MP	24 MP	3820 mAh
TCL 10 SE	LCD	6.52"	HD+ 720×1600	2020.7	MediaTek Helio P22	PowerVR GE8320	4 GB	48 MP; 5 MP; 2 MP	8 MP / 13 MP	4000 mAh										128 GB			
TCL 10L	IPS LCD	6.53"	Full HD+ 1080×2340	2020.5	Qualcomm Snapdragon 665	Adreno 610	6 GB	64 GB; 128 GB	48 MP; 8 MP; 2x 2 MP	4000 mAh	16 MP												
TCL 10 Plus	AMOLED	6.47"	Full HD+ 1080×2340	2020.9	Qualcomm Snapdragon 665	Adreno 610	6 GB; 8 GB	64 GB; 128 GB; 256 GB	48 MP; 8 MP; 2x 2 MP	4500 mAh	16 MP												
TCL 10 Pro	AMOLED	6.47"	Full HD+ 1080×2340	2020.5	Qualcomm Snapdragon 675	Adreno 612	6 GB	128 GB	64 MP; 16 MP; 5 MP; 2 MP	4500 mAh	24 MP												
TCL 10 5G	IPS LCD	6.53"	Full HD+ 1080×2340	2020.7	Qualcomm Snapdragon 765G	Adreno 620	6 GB	128 GB	64 MP; 8 MP; 5 MP; 2 MP	4500 mAh	16 MP												
TCL 10 5G UW	IPS LCD	6.53"	Full HD+ 1080×2340	2020.10	Qualcomm Snapdragon 765G	Adreno 620	6 GB	128 GB	48 MP; 8 MP; 5 MP	4500 mAh	16 MP												
TCL 20 5G	IPS LCD	6.67"	Full HD+ 1080x2400	2020.12	Qualcomm Snapdragon 690	Adreno 619L	6 GB	128 GB; 256 GB	48 MP; 8 MP; 2 MP	4500 mAh	8 MP												
TCL 20 Pro 5G	AMOLED	6.67"	Full HD+ 1080x2400	2021.4	Qualcomm Snapdragon 750G	Adreno 619	6 GB	256 GB	48 MP; 16 MP; 2 MP; 2 MP	4500 mAh	32 MP												
TCL 30 V 5G	IPS LCD	6.67"	Full HD+ 1080x2400	2022.1	Qualcomm Snapdragon 480	Adreno 619	4 GB	128 GB	50 MP; 5 MP; 2 MP	4500 mAh	16 MP												

=== TCL TV Plus ===
In 2015, TCL launched its own streaming television service: GoLive TV or simply GoLive. It was relaunched as TCL TV Plus (stylized as TCLtv+) in 2023.
