= Hitachi W52H =

Mobile phone

W52H
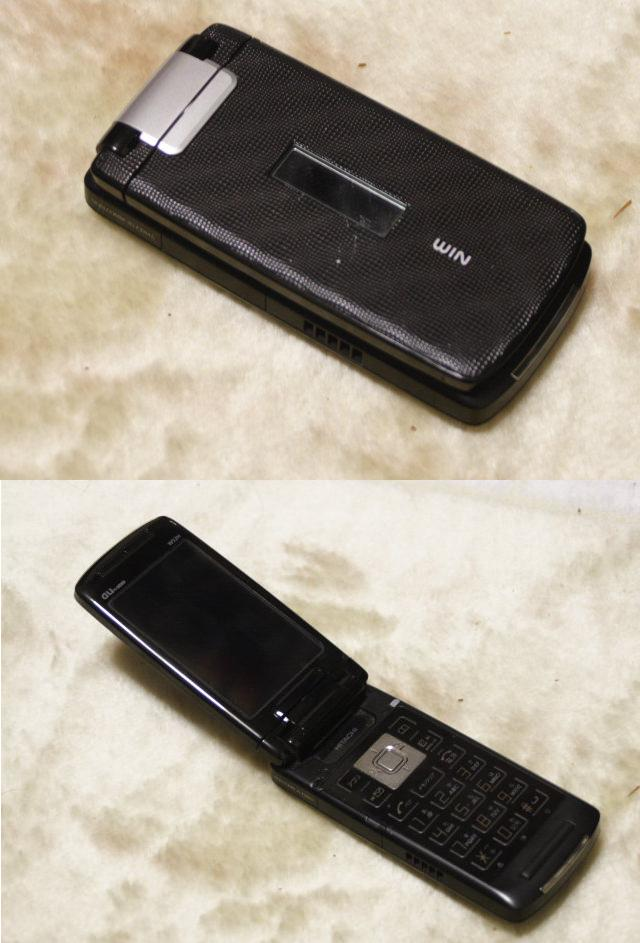
- W52H Relief Black
- Brand: au
- Manufacturer: Hitachi (Casio Hitachi Mobile Communications)
- Type: Feature phone
- First released: June 7, 2007
- Discontinued: October 2007
- Predecessor: W43H/H II
- Compatible networks: 3.5G: CDMA 1X WIN (Packet WIN) (CDMA2000 1xEV-DO Rel.0); 3G: CDMA 1X (Packet 1X) (CDMA2000 1xMC); Frequency bands: 800 MHz / New 800 MHz / 2 GHz
- Form factor: 2-axis swivel flip
- Colors: Fresco Orange; Relief Black; Glaze Silver
- Dimensions: 106 mm (4.2 in) H 50 mm (2.0 in) W 22 mm (0.87 in) D
- Weight: 141 g (5.0 oz)
- Operating system: REX OS + KCP
- CPU: Qualcomm MSM6550 (225 MHz)
- Storage: 100 MB internal data folder
- Removable storage: microSD
- Battery: 1100 mAh
- Charging: 160 minutes
- Rear camera: 2.07 MP CMOS (Autofocus, image stabilization, text reader)
- Front camera: None
- Display: Main: 2.9 in (74 mm) IPS LCD, Wide QVGA (240×400 dots), 260k colors Sub: 1.1 in (28 mm) White OLED, 128×36 dots, 2 colors
- Made in: Japan
- Website: k-tai.hitachi.jp/w52h/

The W52H is a CDMA 1X WIN mobile phone manufactured by Hitachi (Casio Hitachi Mobile Communications) for the Japanese market under the au brand, operated by KDDI and Okinawa Cellular Telephone. It was released sequentially starting on June 7, 2007.

== Features ==
It is the successor to the "W43H/H II", which featured an IPS LCD and the "Picture Master for Mobile" image processing technology derived from Wooo televisions. It serves as a sister model to the Casio W52CA, which was announced in the same period. It is a high-performance 1seg TV phone. The body surface texture around the display area differs depending on the color scheme, and it is the first Hitachi device to feature a sheet-type keypad. Additionally, because the side keys next to the LCD screen were removed, key assignments for operating 1seg TV functions slightly changed compared to the W43H/H II. Furthermore, this model is the first Hitachi phone to support the new 800 MHz frequency band.

In the Fuji TV drama Yam Onna Kabe Onna, Misaki Ito (playing Megumi Aoyagi) used the Glaze Silver model, while Hiroki Kawada of Garage Sale (playing Tetsuto Matsubara) used the Fresco Orange model during the show.

=== Specifications ===
- Adopting a large-capacity 1100 mAh battery realized an industry-leading maximum 1seg viewing time of up to 7 hours via One-Seg (when using earphones, screen brightness set to 3, and DBEX function set to "OFF"; 6 hours and 45 minutes with DBEX "ON"). Music playback time via LISMO reaches up to 24 hours. The recording function supports "background recording," allowing users to send emails while recording. It is also the first Hitachi phone to support test broadcasts of terrestrial digital audio broadcasting.
- Supports new services such as LISMO Video Clips and Touch Message.
- Main display size increased from 2.6 inches to 2.9 inches.
- Newly equipped with a sub-display.
- Internal data folder storage expanded from 50 MB to 100 MB.
- Camera functionality newly supports a "Text Reader" feature.
- Supports high-speed infrared communication "IrSimple".
- Calendar supports dates up to December 31, 2020.

=== Supported Services ===
- au Smart Sports (application download required)
- Hello Messenger
- au LISTEN MOBILE SERVICE (Video Clip supported)
- EZ Navi Walk (Voice input & 3D supported)
- EZ Passenger Navi
- Anshin Navi
- Disaster Navi
- Emergency Call Location Notification
- EZ FeliCa
- EZ Channel Plus
- EZ・FM
- Infrared Communication (IrSimple)
- EZ Keitai Arrange
- PC Site Viewer
- EZappli (BREW) (Open App Player supported)
- Decoration Mail
- Ekaberi Mail
- Wrapping Mail
- Touch Message
- SD-Video
- SD-Audio (AAC)

== History ==
- May 22, 2007: Officially announced by KDDI and Hitachi.
- June 7, 2007: Pre-released in the Okinawa region.
- June 8, 2007: Released in the Tōhoku, Kantō, Chūbu, Chūgoku, Shikoku, and Kyushu regions.
- June 9, 2007: Released in Hokkaido, Hokuriku and Kansai regions.
- October 2007: Sales ended.

== See also ==
- Mobile phone
- au (mobile phone)
- Hitachi
- CDMA 1X WIN
- Misaki Ito – Image character; also served as image character for Hitachi's "Prius" PC line.
- Mitsuki Takahata – Featured the full-length short-size Chaku-Uta Full sample track of her debut song "Taisetsu na Mono" under the name Mitsuki for trial listening.
