= Samsung Z2 =

2016 smartphone

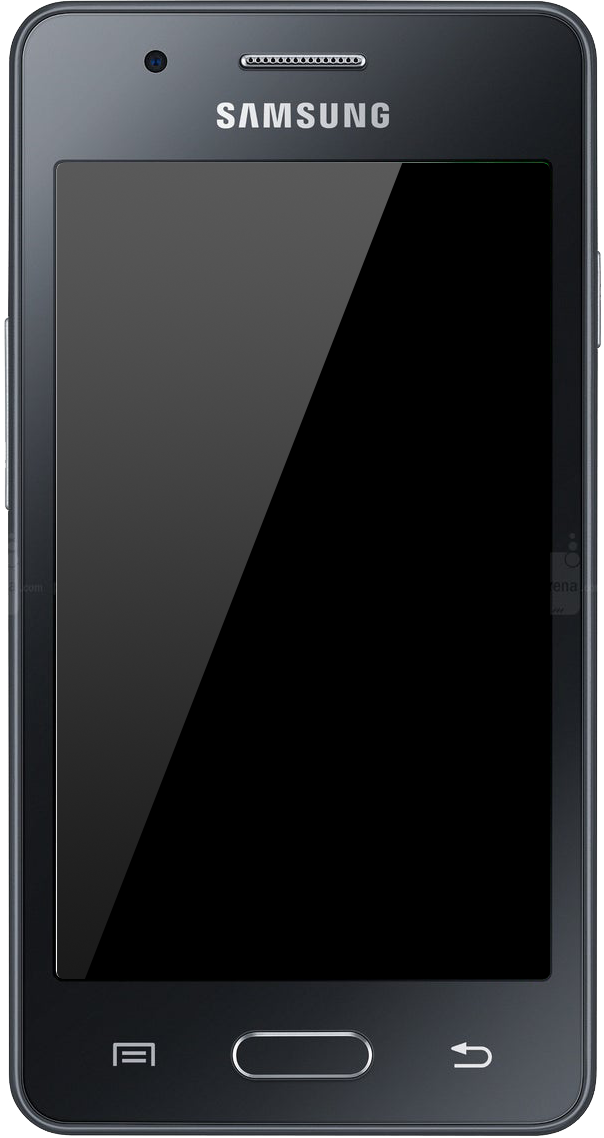
- Brand: Samsung
- Manufacturer: Samsung Electronics
- Type: Touchscreen smartphone
- Series: Z Series
- First released: 23 August 2016; 9 years ago
- Availability by region: 29 August 2016; 9 years ago
- Predecessor: Samsung Z1
- Related: Samsung Z3
- Compatible networks: GSM, HSPA, LTE: 150, 50 Mbps
- Form factor: Slate
- Dimensions: 121.5 mm (4.78 in) H 63 mm (2.5 in) W 10.8 mm (0.43 in) D
- Weight: 127 g (4.5 oz)
- Operating system: Tizen 2.4.0.7
- System-on-chip: Spreadtrum SC9830
- CPU: Quad-core 1.5 GHz cortex-A7
- GPU: Mali-400 MP2
- Memory: 1 GB RAM
- Storage: 8 GB
- Removable storage: Up to two 128 GB microSDXCs
- Battery: 1500 mAh Li-ion
- Rear camera: 5 MP, f/2.2, LED flash
- Front camera: 0.3 MP
- Display: 4" TFT capacitive touchscreen 480 x 800 WVGA(223 ppi)
- Connectivity: Wi-Fi 802.11 b/g/n, Wi-Fi Direct, Bluetooth 4, micro USB 2.0, FM radio, USB On-The-Go, A-GPS, A-Glonass
- Website: www.samsung.com/in/microsite/z2/

Samsung Z2 is a smartphone produced by Samsung. It is the third smartphone to be shipped with the Tizen operating system, after the Samsung Z1 and Samsung Z3. The Z2 was the first 4G smartphone powered by Tizen and was released on August 29, 2016.

In India, the Samsung Z2 was available with a Reliance Jio 4G preview offer, which provided unlimited calls, messages, and data for the first three months.

Its successor, the Samsung Z4, was released in May 2017.

== Specifications ==
The Samsung Z2 is powered by a Spreadtrum SC9830 SoC including a quad-core 1.5 GHz ARM Cortex-A7 CPU and 1 GB RAM. The 8 GB internal storage can be upgraded up to 128 GB via microSD card.

It features a 4.0-inch TFT display. The rear camera has 5 megapixels with LED flash and f/2.2 aperture; the front camera has 0.3 megapixels with f/2.4 aperture.
