= Casio EXILIM Keitai CA-01C =

Flip phone manufacutred by NEC

EXILIM Keitai CA-01C
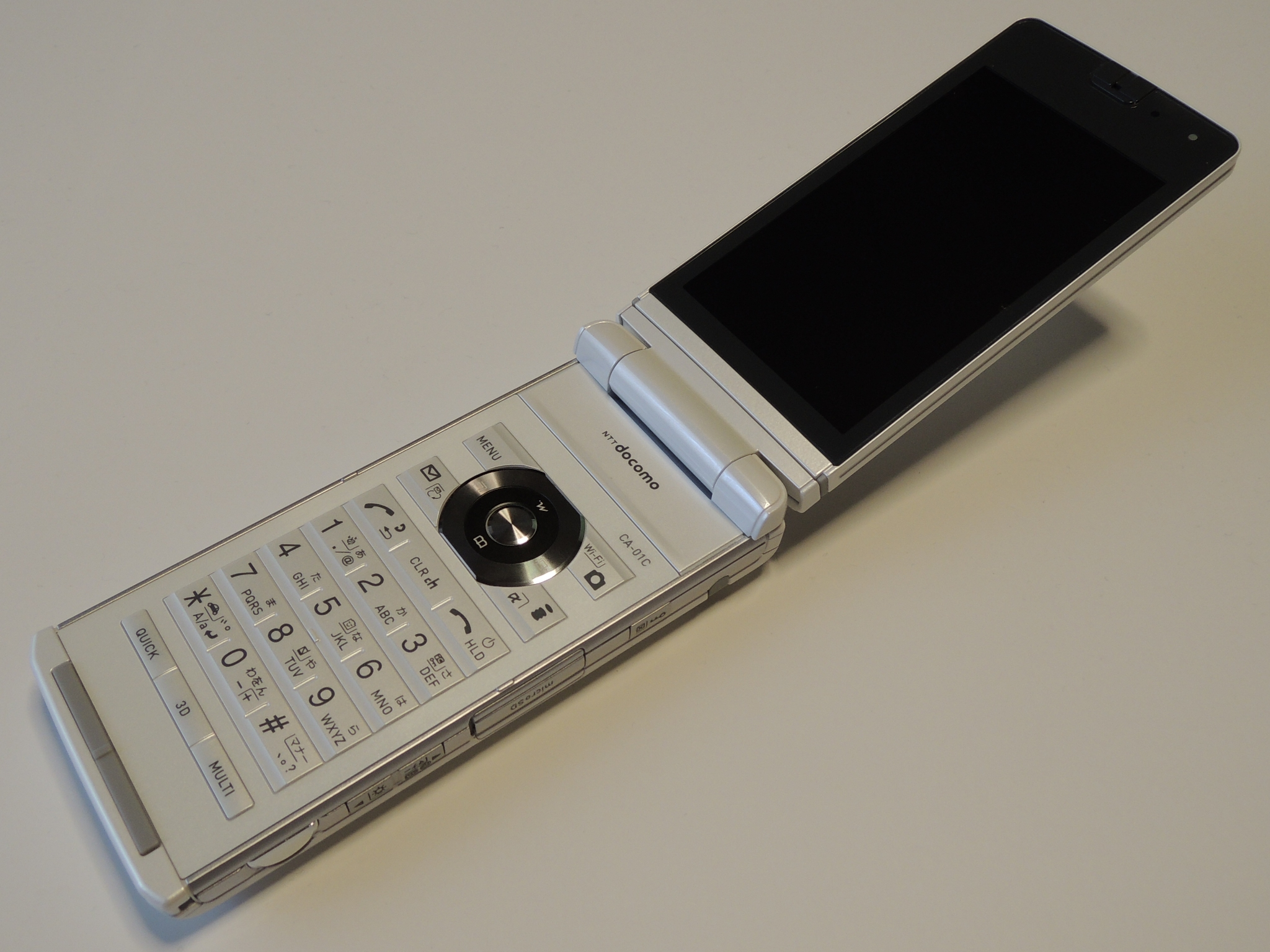
- CA-01C open
- Brand: Casio (EXILIM)
- Developer: NEC Casio Mobile Communications
- Manufacturer: NEC Casio Mobile Communications
- Series: docomo PRIME series
- First released: July 16, 2011
- Compatible networks: 3G: FOMA (W-CDMA); 2G: GSM
- Form factor: Waterproof 2-axis flip phone
- Colors: Vivid Pink; Pearl White; Glass Black
- Dimensions: 114 mm (4.5 in) H 51 mm (2.0 in) W 16.9 mm (0.67 in) D (thickest section approx. 21.0 mm (0.83 in))
- Weight: 149 g (5.3 oz)
- Operating system: Access Linux Platform + OPP(L)
- CPU: Texas Instruments OMAP3630
- Removable storage: microSD (up to 2 GB), microSDHC (up to 32 GB)
- Rear camera: 16.3 MP backside-illuminated CMOS, HD video recording, image stabilization, face detection, 3D capture
- Display: Main: 3.4 in (86 mm) TFT LCD (3D capable), 480 × 854 Full Wide VGA, 16,777,216 colors Sub: 0.8 in (20 mm) Monochrome OLED, 96 × 35 pixels
- Water resistance: IPX5/IPX8 (waterproof), IP5X (dustproof)
- Model: CA-01C

The docomo PRIME series EXILIM Keitai CA-01C is a 3rd generation mobile communications (FOMA) terminal manufactured by NEC Casio Mobile Communications for NTT Docomo. Although branded under Casio's EXILIM name and bearing the "CA" designation, it was fully developed and produced by NEC Casio without direct development involvement from Casio, effectively treating the device as an NEC ("N") terminal. With the discontinuation of the docomo PRIME series following the Summer 2011 lineup, this model became the final device in the series. Following Casio's exit from NEC Casio in December 2013 and the eventual dissolution of the company into NEC in March 2016, the CA-01C remains the sole Casio-branded handset released for NTT Docomo.

== History ==
- March 10, 2011 – Passed TELEC certification.
- May 16, 2011 – Officially announced by NTT Docomo.
- July 16, 2011 – Released for sale.

== Specifications ==
=== Hardware ===
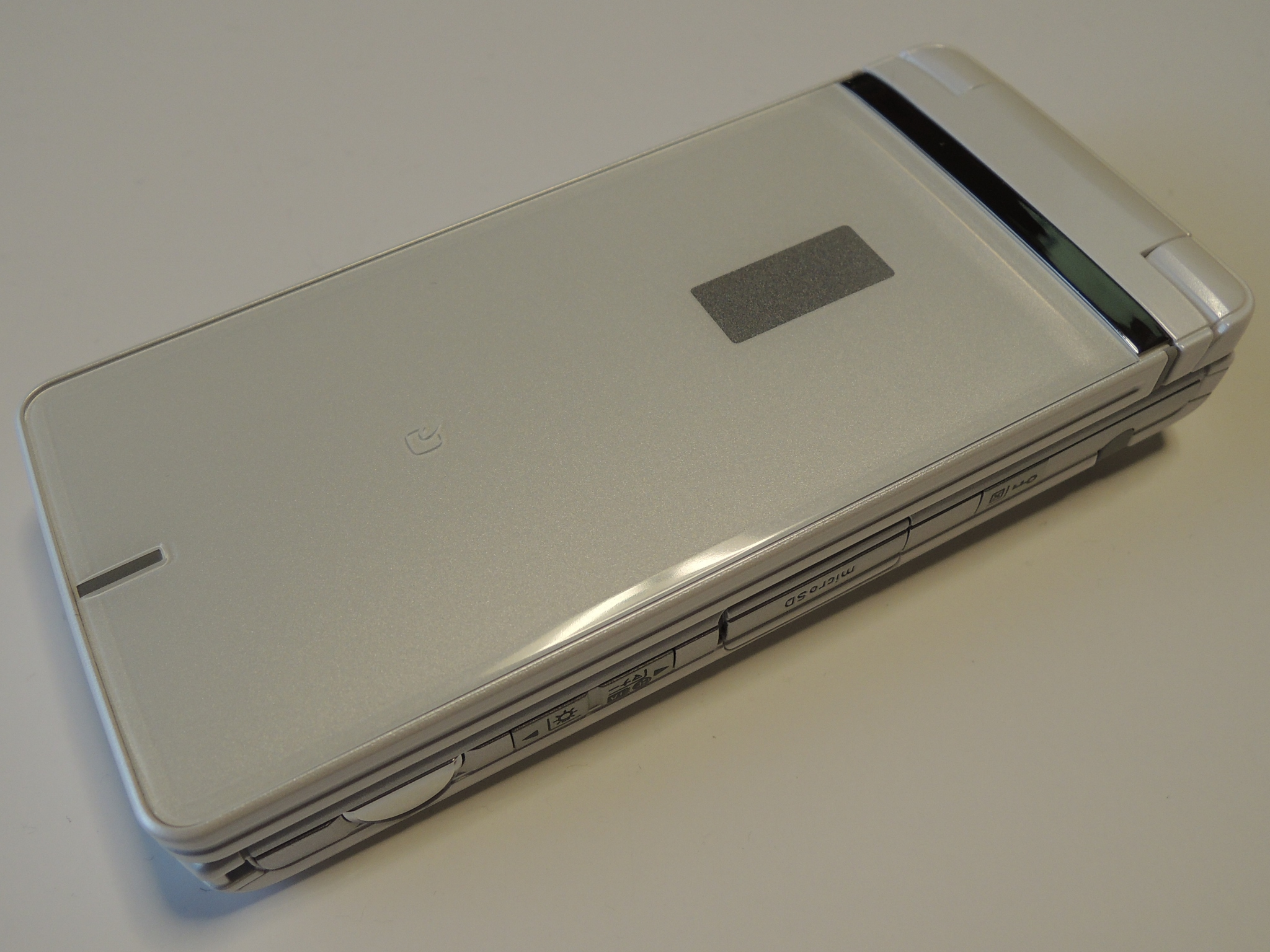
Front view, unopened

The CA-01C features a 2-axis folding form factor with a 180-degree rotating screen that allows it to be held like a traditional digital camera. Its main display is a 3.4-inch stereoscopic (parallax barrier) 3D TFT LCD running at Full Wide VGA resolution (480 × 854 pixels), which permits glasses-free 3D viewing, while a secondary 0.8-inch monochrome OLED screen (96 × 35 pixels) is situated on the exterior. The main display integrates a capacitive touchscreen supporting flick input and touch-based camera tracking controls.

Powering the device is a Texas Instruments OMAP3630 processor. It includes support for 3G FOMA (HSDPA/HSUPA) and 2G GSM networks, Wi-Fi (IEEE 802.11b/g/n) with tethering capabilities, Bluetooth 2.1+EDR, FeliCa for Osaifu-Keitai services, IrSimple/IrSS infrared, an FM transmitter, and a Type-D Micro HDMI port. Memory expansion is provided via microSD and microSDHC cards up to 32 GB. The phone holds IPX5/IPX8 water resistance and IP5X dust resistance ratings.

=== Cameras ===
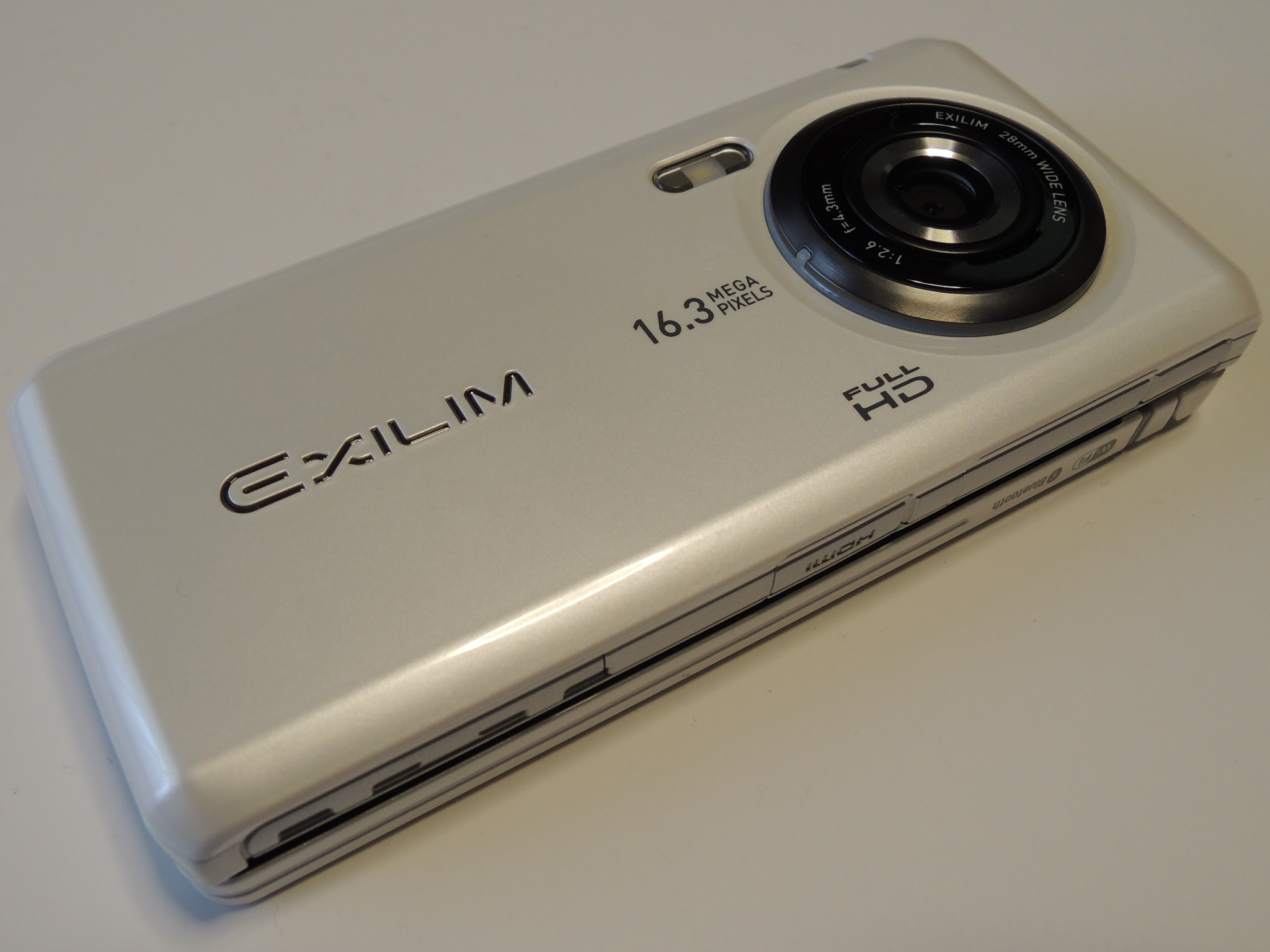
Rear panel view, showing the camera

As for camera features, it is equipped with a 16.3-megapixel back-illuminated CMOS sensor and the EXILIM Engine for Mobile, achieving high sensitivity and low noise, which enables shooting in the dark even without a flash. Although it does not have twin cameras, shooting 3D images is also possible by shifting the camera horizontally while taking photos. Additionally, it features a function that boots up in 0.5 seconds; in reality, as mentioned earlier, this is the "Shunsatsu" (Instant Capture) feature due to this device being virtually an N-series phone.

The camera features up to approximately 42.6× zoom (77 levels) for still images and up to 36.5× zoom (76 levels) for video recording. It includes autofocus, image stabilization, photo light, face detection, macro (close-up) mode, and continuous photo capture (4 to 30 shots). It supports high ISO sensitivity up to ISO 6400 for still photos and up to ISO 400 for video.

=== Software ===
The device runs on the Access Linux Platform combined with NTT Docomo's Operator Pack (OPP). Text entry options include T9 software integration. Pre-installed applications include various 3D games (such as Sonic Golf 3D and 3D WANBO Puzzle), full electronic dictionary software, voice recognition tools (Voice Quick Launch, Voice Input Mail), and standard Docomo i-mode services (including 50MB i-motion support and i-widget utilities).

This also comes with a pre-installed "Sonic Golf 3D".

== Known issues ==
On January 11, 2012, a software update was distributed to resolve an issue where One-Seg broadcasts launched via multitasking during i-appli execution could fail to record properly. Additionally, brief power interruptions may occur due to poor contact at the battery terminals.
