= Casio Exilim CA005 =

2010 mobile phone model

EXILIM Keitai CA005
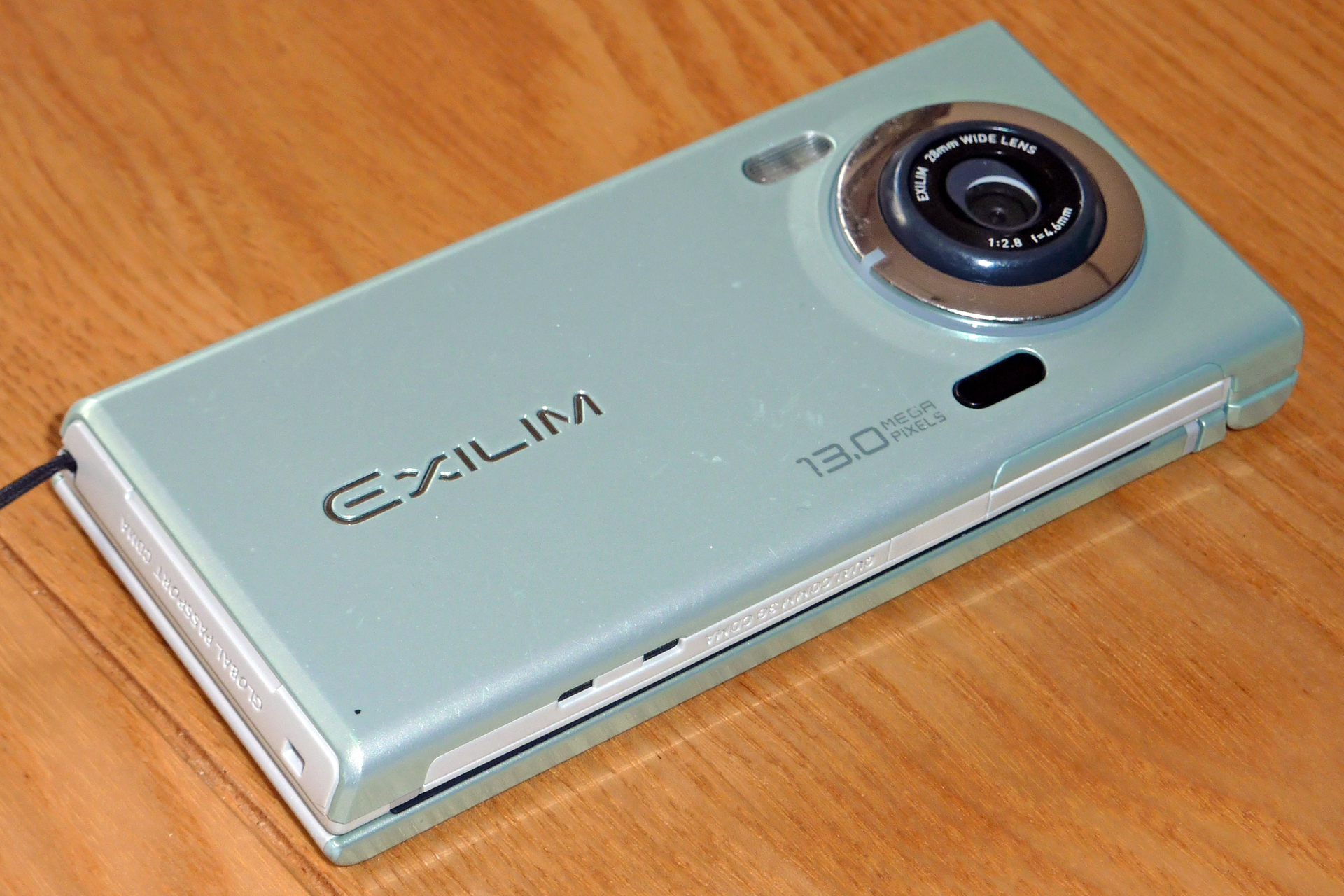
- EXILIM Keitai CA005
- Brand: au
- Developer: Casio
- Manufacturer: NEC Casio Mobile Communications
- Type: Feature phone
- Series: EXILIM Keitai
- First released: May 28, 2010
- Compatible networks: CDMA 1X WIN (CDMA2000 1xMC / 1xEV-DO Rev.A); 800 MHz / New 800 MHz / 2 GHz
- Form factor: Waterproof dual-axis clamshell
- Colors: Light Green; White; Pink×Purple; Black
- Dimensions: 110 mm (4.3 in) H 50 mm (2.0 in) W 14.5 mm (0.57 in) D
- Weight: 124 g (4.4 oz)
- Operating system: KCP+
- CPU: Qualcomm MSM7500 (600 MHz)
- Storage: 500 MB (Data folder)
- Removable storage: microSD (up to 2 GB) microSDHC (up to 16 GB)
- Battery: Continuous talk time: approx. 290 minutes Continuous standby time: approx. 320 hours
- Charging: AC adapter: approx. 150 minutes DC adapter: approx. 170 minutes
- Rear camera: 12.95 MP CMOS with AF, image stabilization, and face detection
- Front camera: None
- Display: 3.2 in (81 mm) IPS LCD; Wide VGA+ (480×854 pixels); 260,000 colors
- Water resistance: Yes
- Model: CA005
- Made in: China

The EXILIM Keitai CA005 is a mobile phone developed for the Japanese market by Casio Computer and NEC Casio Mobile Communications (now NEC). It was released on May 28, 2010 for the au brand operated by KDDI and Okinawa Cellular Telephone on their CDMA 1X WIN (later au 3G) network.

== Specifications ==
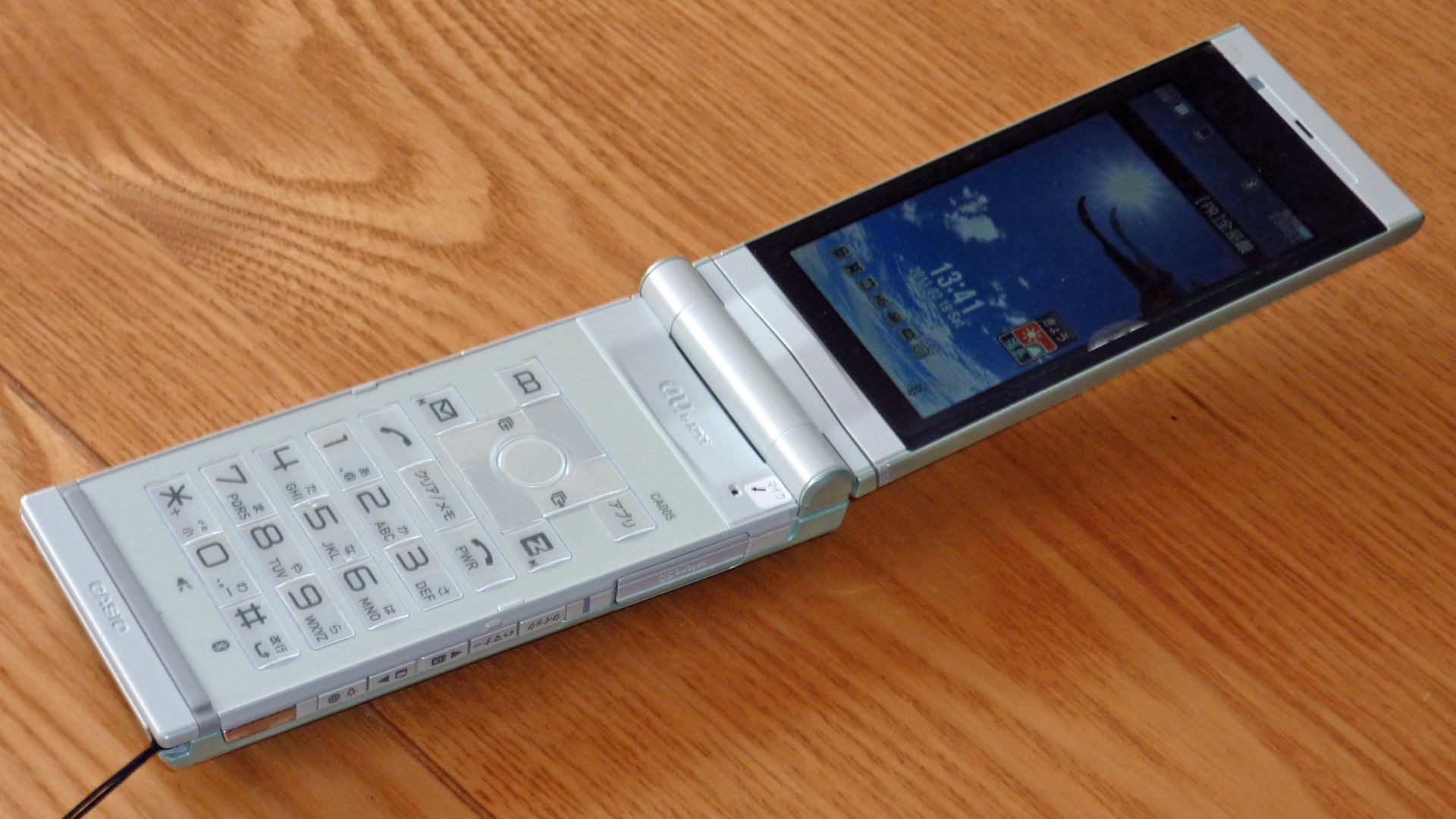
Front panel view, unfolded

Memory expandable options support microSDHC cards with capacities up to 16 GB.

Supported network features and services include One-Seg digital television, Osaifu-Keitai contactless wallet functionality, Bluetooth, infrared communication, Global Passport CDMA roaming, and LISMO media services.

The device delivers an estimated continuous standby time of up to 320 hours and a continuous talk time of up to 290 minutes.

The CA005 was offered in four color finishes: Light Green, White, Pink × Purple, and Black.

== Camera ==
The primary camera features a 12.95-megapixel CMOS sensor with autofocus and image stabilization.

Image processing is driven by the dedicated "EXILIM Engine for Mobile" system.

The maximum photo capture resolution is 13 megapixels (4,128 × 3,096 pixels), with support for seven image sizes down to 0.3 megapixels.

Camera functionality includes dynamic photo merging, smile detection, "Auto Best Shot" scene detection, high-speed continuous shooting up to 20 frames per second at 2-megapixel resolution, and a 7-color LED flash.
