= Vodafone 360 Samsung M1 =

Mobile phone model

Vodafone 360 Samsung M1 is a Linux Mobile based handset mobile phone released in November 2009.

This cellphone was specifically made for Vodafone's 360 service, which was meant to round up everything from phone calls, to e-mails together for the ease of the consumer.
