= Casio G'zOne TYPE-L =

2012 smartphone model

G'zOne TYPE-L CAL21
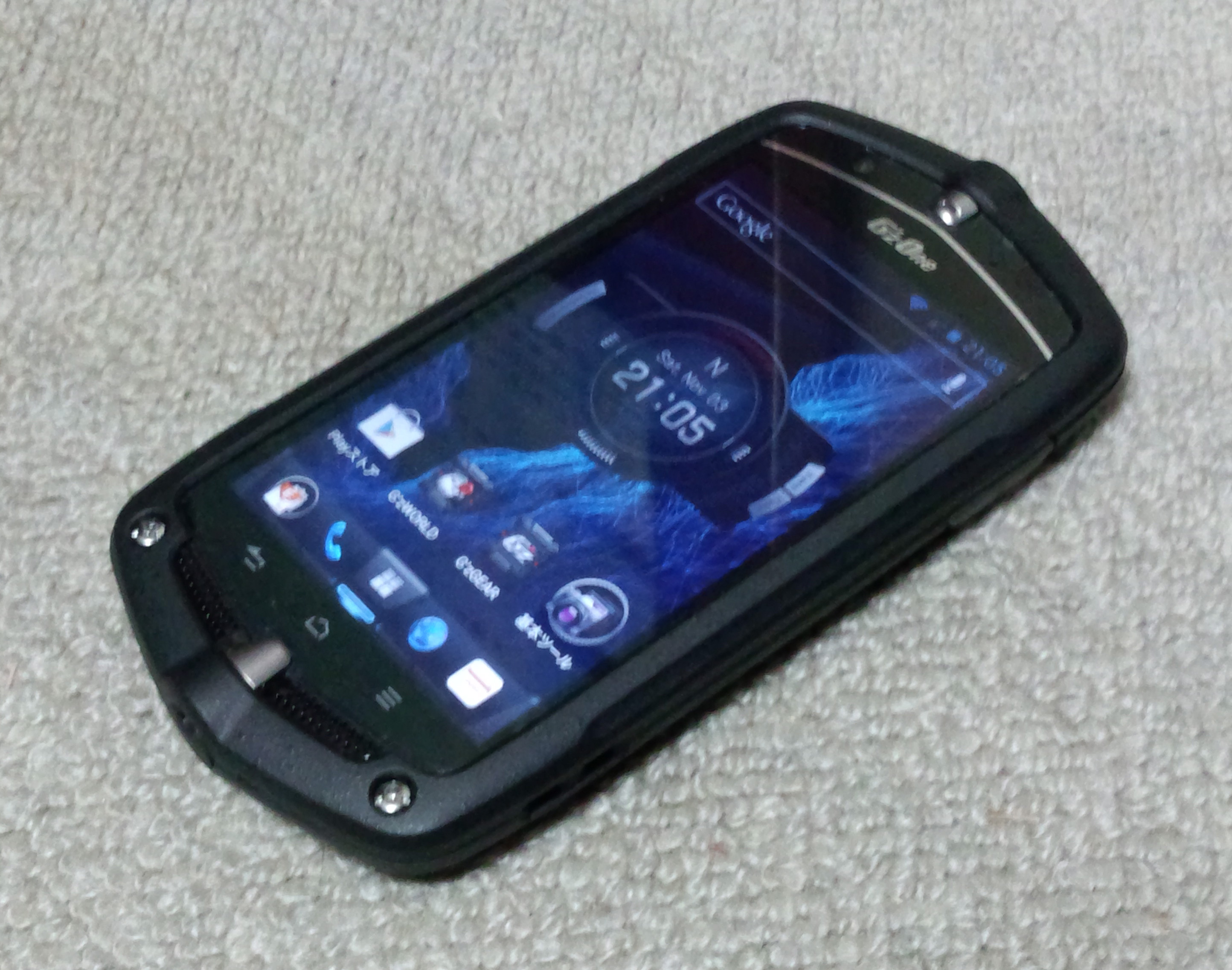
- Front view of G'zOne TYPE-L CAL21
- Brand: au
- Manufacturer: NEC Casio Mobile Communications
- Type: Smartphone
- Series: G'zOne
- First released: November 2, 2012
- Discontinued: July 2013
- Predecessor: IS11CA
- Compatible networks: 3G: CDMA2000 1xMC (au 3G) (New 800 MHz / 2 GHz), W-CDMA (850 MHz / 2 GHz); 2G: GSM (1.9 GHz / 1.8 GHz / 900 MHz); Data: 3.9G FDD-LTE (au 4G LTE) (New 800 MHz / 1.5 GHz), 3.5G CDMA2000 1xEV-DO MC-Rev.A (WIN HIGH SPEED), CDMA2000 1xEV-DO Rev.A / Rel.0 (CDMA 1X WIN), UMTS (W-CDMA), 3G CDMA2000 1xMC; Other: Wi-Fi IEEE 802.11a/b/g/n (2.4 GHz / 5 GHz)
- Form factor: Slate
- Colors: Red; Black
- Dimensions: 134 mm (5.3 in) H 69 mm (2.7 in) W 14.7 mm (0.58 in) D
- Weight: 181 g (6.4 oz)
- Operating system: Android 4.0.4
- System-on-chip: Qualcomm Snapdragon S4
- CPU: 1.5 GHz dual-core MSM8960
- Memory: 1 GB RAM
- Storage: 8 GB ROM
- Removable storage: microSD (up to 2 GB), microSDHC (up to 32 GB)
- Battery: 1,800 mAh
- Charging: Desktop holder (approx. 110 min), AC adapter (approx. 150 min)
- Rear camera: 8.08 MP CMOS, autofocus, 1080p Full HD video recording, SNS sharing
- Front camera: 1.36 MP CMOS, hand mirror function
- Display: 4.0 in (102 mm) IPS WVGA (800 × 480 pixels), 16,777,216 colors
- Water resistance: Waterproof and dustproof
- Model: CAL21
- Made in: China

The G'zOne TYPE-L CAL21 is an Android smartphone developed by NEC Casio Mobile Communications (now NEC) and Casio for the au brand operated by KDDI and Okinawa Cellular Telephone. It supports au 3G (formerly CDMA 1X WIN) and 3.9G au 4G LTE networks.

On July 31, 2013, parent company NEC announced its withdrawal from the smartphone market, and it was revealed in 2021 that mobile phone business operations had fully ceased by 2014, making this device the final NEC Casio mobile handset released for the carrier.

The G'zOne CA-201L, a variant released for South Korea's LG Uplus, is also described here for convenience.

== History ==
On October 17, 2012, KDDI, NEC Casio Mobile Communications, and Casio officially announced the G'zOne TYPE-L CAL21.

Pre-sales began in the Kanto and Okinawa regions on November 2, 2012, followed by a nationwide release in all remaining regions on November 3, 2012.

Sales were discontinued in the Okinawa region in January 2013, ended in the Hokkaido, Tohoku, Chubu, Kansai, and Kyushu regions in June 2013, and ceased in all remaining regions by July 2013.

== Specifications ==
=== Hardware ===
The device serves as the successor to the IS11CA and adds support for the au 4G LTE network. It features a 4.0-inch WVGA IPS display and a 1,800 mAh removable battery. Powered by a 1.5 GHz dual-core Qualcomm Snapdragon S4 MSM8960 processor, it includes 1 GB of RAM and 8 GB of internal ROM, expandable up to 32 GB via microSDHC.

For photography, the rear camera uses an 8.08 MP CMOS sensor capable of 1080p Full HD video recording, while the front camera incorporates a 1.36 MP CMOS sensor.

The exterior design varies by color option, with the red model utilizing a glossy finish and the black model employing a textured leather-tone finish. Hardware capabilities include One Seg TV tuning, infrared communications (IrSimple/IrSS), desktop charging contacts, and Bluetooth 4.0 connectivity with G-SHOCK smartwatch integration, allowing atmospheric pressure notifications to be sent to compatible watches. NFC is not supported on the domestic CAL21 variant.

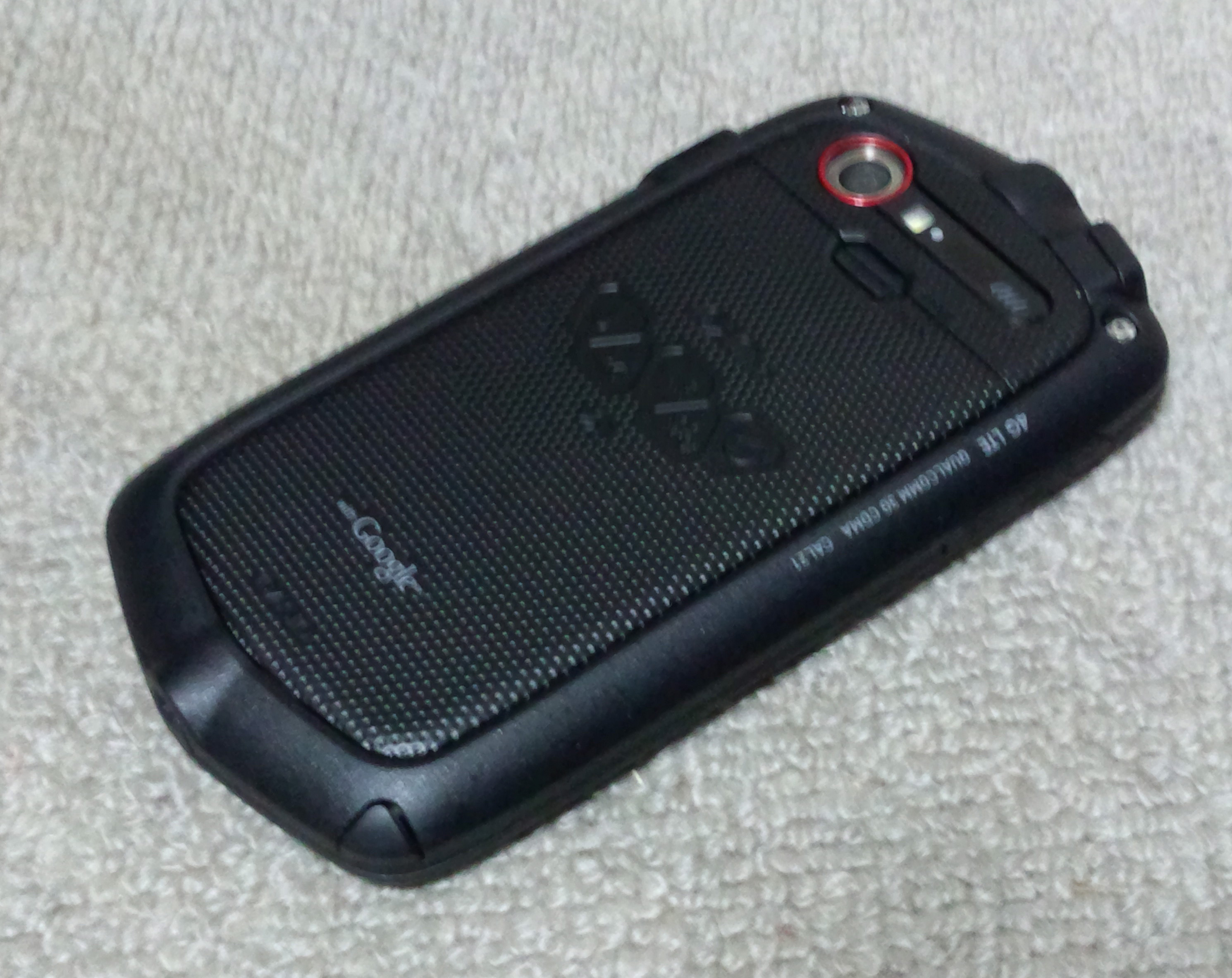
Back panel

A Korean variant, designated as the CA-201L, was released for LG Uplus in March 2013. It features a modified body shape, doubled storage capacity to 16 GB, and includes NFC support instead of FeliCa. An equivalent model was subsequently released for Verizon Wireless in the United States as the Casio G'zOne Commando 4G LTE.

=== Software ===
The smartphone runs Android 4.0.4 with Japanese text input powered by ATOK.

It includes the sensor application suite "G'zGEAR", which incorporates a barometer to track atmospheric pressure changes and notify users of sudden weather shifts. Additionally, it comes pre-installed with "G'zWORLD", a dedicated social tracking app that lets users log and share location pins and routes on a map. Together, these outdoor sharing features are designated as "LIVE G", with the "L" in the product name representing both LTE and "LIVE".

Pre-installed applications include Friends Note, Google+, YouTube, LISMO Player, au Cloud, Movie Studio, Play Movies, Chrome, CA'zCAFE, GET CA by CASIO, G-SHOCK App, Twipple, DiXiM (DLNA/DTCP-IP), Quickoffice, and Raku Raku Wireless Start EX.

== Known issues ==
Software updates were distributed to address various technical issues following launch:

- November 14, 2012: Fixed an issue where the touch panel would become unresponsive, and improved audio recording quality for video capture as well as speech recognition accuracy for apps like Voice Assistant and Google Voice Search.
- January 16, 2013: Improved notification LED behavior during sleep or charging, resolved random reboot issues, fixed screen flickering when automatic brightness was enabled, and added a confirmation prompt when placing calls from contacts to prevent accidental dialing.
- February 28, 2013: Fixed an issue where the microSD card would unmount unexpectedly.
- May 29, 2013: Fixed an issue where the display would not turn on when waking the phone from sleep, and resolved random reboots during Wi-Fi usage.
- July 2, 2013: Fixed an issue where data communications would fail when roaming overseas.
