= NEC Casio MEDIAS LTE N-04D =

NEC Casio mobile phone

MEDIAS LTE N-04D
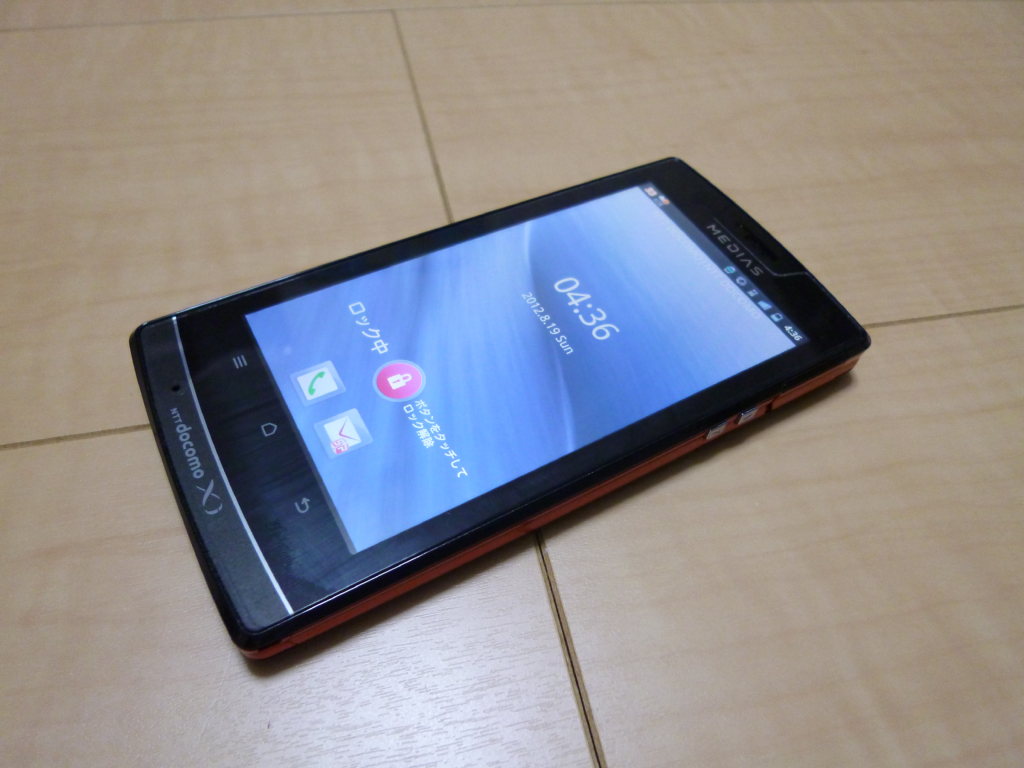
- N-04D Front
- Brand: MEDIAS
- Developer: NEC Casio Mobile Communications
- Manufacturer: NEC Casio Mobile Communications
- Type: Smartphone
- Series: MEDIAS
- First released: February 15, 2012
- Compatible networks: 3.9G: Xi, 3G: FOMA (W-CDMA), 2G: GSM, Wireless LAN (IEEE 802.11b/g/n)
- Form factor: Bar
- Color: Advance Black
- Dimensions: 131 mm (5.2 in) H / 67 mm (2.6 in) W / 10.9 mm (0.43 in) D (Thickest part approx. 11.3 mm)
- Weight: 149 g (5.3 oz)
- Operating system: Android 2.3.6 (upgradable to 4.0.4)
- System-on-chip: Qualcomm Snapdragon S3 APQ8060
- CPU: 1.2 GHz Dual-core
- GPU: Adreno 220
- Memory: 1 GB RAM
- Storage: 16 GB ROM (Data folder approx. 10.67 GB)
- Removable storage: microSD (up to 2GB), microSDHC (up to 32GB)
- SIM: miniUIM
- Battery: 1520 mAh
- Charging: Approx. 220 minutes
- Rear camera: 8.1 MP CMOS, HD 1080p video recording, image stabilization, face recognition, aperture f/2.4
- Front camera: None
- Display: 4.3 in, 720 × 1280 pixels, TFT, ~16.77 million colors
- Water resistance: IPX5/IPX8
- Model: N-04D

The docomo NEXT Series MEDIAS LTE N-04D is an Android touchscreen mobile phone manufactured and developed by NEC Casio Mobile Communications for NTT Docomo. It supports Xi (3.9G) and FOMA (3G) compatible networks.

It was announced on October 18, 2011. Preorders start on February 3, 2012 and released on February 15, 2012.

== Specifications ==
Rear panel view

The N-04D is powered by a Qualcomm APQ 8060 dual-core processor clocking a 1.2GHz with a battery capacity of 1520 mAh, which converts to approximately 250-340 minutes of talk time.

Externally, it has a TFT LCD display of 4.3 inches, with a resolution of 720 x 1280 pixels and the camera is equipped with an 8.1-megapixel CMOS sensor.

With Xi's bandwith, it has a maximum download speed of 75 mb/s and an upload speed of 25 mb/s.

It runs on Android 2.3.6 Gingerbread. It was upgradeable to Android 4.0.4 Ice Cream Sandwitch.
