= Tizen Association =

Non-profit consortium

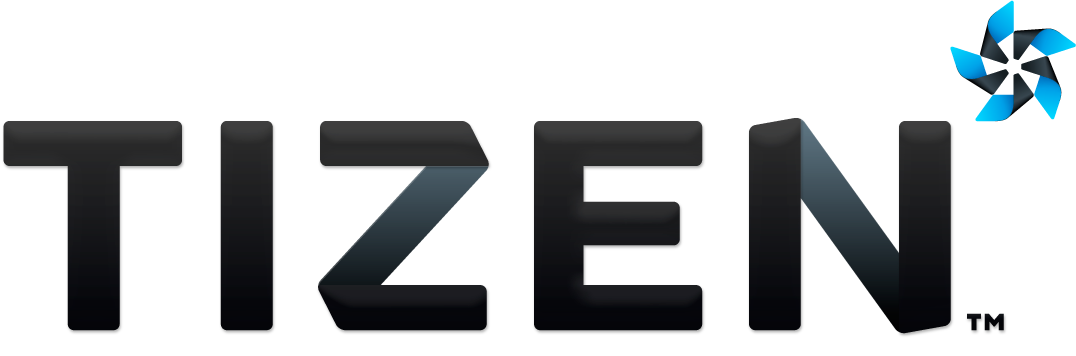
- Formation: January 2007; 19 years ago
- Type: Not for profit consortium
- Website: www.tizen.org
- Formerly called: LiMo Foundation

The Tizen Association, formerly the LiMo Foundation (short for Linux Mobile), is a non-profit consortium which develops and maintains the Tizen mobile operating system. Tizen is a Linux-based operating system for smartphones and other mobile devices. The founding members were Motorola, NEC, NTT DoCoMo, Panasonic Mobile Communications, Samsung Electronics, and Vodafone. The consortium's work resulted in the LiMo Platform—which was integrated into mobile phone products from NEC, Panasonic and Samsung—and later became the Tizen platform.

== Members ==
Members of the Tizen Association are:

| Founding and Core Members | Associate Members |
|---|---|
| === Founding members === : NEC Casio Mobile Communications; NTT Docomo; Panasonic; Samsung Electronics; Vodafone; Intel; === Core members === : ACCESS; Orange S.A.; SK Telecom; Telefonica; Verizon Wireless; Wind River Systems | ARM Limited; Adobe; ETRI; Gemalto; Huawei; Incross Limited; KDDI; Marvell; Mozilla; NTT Data MSE; Renesas Electronics; SoftBank; Telecom Italia |

== Phones ==
Phones using LiMo include:

| Motorola | NEC | Panasonic | Samsung |
|---|---|---|---|
| RAZR² V8; RAZR² V8 Luxury Edition; ROKR E8; ROKR EM30; ROKR U9; ROKR Z6 | docomo PRIME seriesTM N-01A; docomo STYLE seriesTM N-02A; docomo STYLE seriesTM N-03A; docomo SMART seriesTM N-04A; docomo PRIME seriesTM N-06A; docomo PRIME seriesTM N-07A; docomo STYLE seriesTM N-08A; docomo SMART seriesTM N-09A; docomo STYLE seriesTM N-01B; docomo PRIME seriesTM N-02B; docomo STYLE seriesTM N-03B; docomo PRIME seriesTM N-04B; docomo STYLE seriesTM N-05B; docomo STYLE seriesTM N-06B; docomo SMART seriesTM N-07B; docomo PRO seriesTM N-08B; docomo STYLE seriesTM N-01C; docomo STYLE seriesTM N-02C; docomo PRIME seriesTM N-03C; N706ie; N905iμ; N705i; N905i | docomo PRIME seriesTM P-01A; docomo STYLE seriesTM P-02A; docomo STYLE seriesTM P-03A; docomo SMART seriesTM P-04A; docomo SMART seriesTM P-05A; docomo STYLE seriesTM P-06A; docomo PRIME seriesTM P-07A; docomo STYLE seriesTM P-08A; docomo SMART seriesTM P-09A; docomo STYLE seriesTM P-10A; docomo PRIME seriesTM P-01B; docomo STYLE seriesTM P-02B; docomo SMART seriesTM P-03B; docomo PRIME seriesTM P-04B; docomo STYLE seriesTM P-05B; docomo STYLE seriesTM P-06B; docomo STYLE seriesTM P-07B; docomo SMART seriesTM P-01C; docomo STYLE seriesTM P-02C; docomo PRIME seriesTM P-03C; P706ie; P705i; P905i; P905iTV; P906I | GT-i6410 (R2.0.1); GT-i8320 Protector (R2.0.1); Vodafone 360 H1 (R2.0.1); Vodafone 360 M1 (R2.0.1); SCH-M510 (R2.0.1); SGH-i800 (R2.0.1); GT-i8305 Riedel (R2.0.1) |

== LiMo & Tizen ==
In the end of September 2011 it was announced by the Linux Foundation that MeeGo will be totally replaced by the Tizen mobile operating system project during 2012. Tizen will be a new free and open source Linux-based operating-system which itself will not be released until the first quarter of 2012. Intel and Samsung, in collaboration with the LiMo Foundation and assisting MeeGo developers, have been pointed out to lead the development of this new software platform, using third-party developer frameworks that will primarily be built on the HTML5 and other web standards. As of October 2012, the LiMo website traffic is redirected to tizen.org.

== See also ==
- Linux Phone Standards Forum
- Android (operating system) from Google
- MeeGo Operating System from Nokia and Intel (former Maemo and Moblin)
- Openmoko
- Symbian Foundation
- Open Handset Alliance

| Preceded by LiMo Foundation | Tizen Association; 2016 | Succeeded by None |
