= Casio Exilim Keitai CA003 =

Mobile phone

EXILIM Keitai CA003
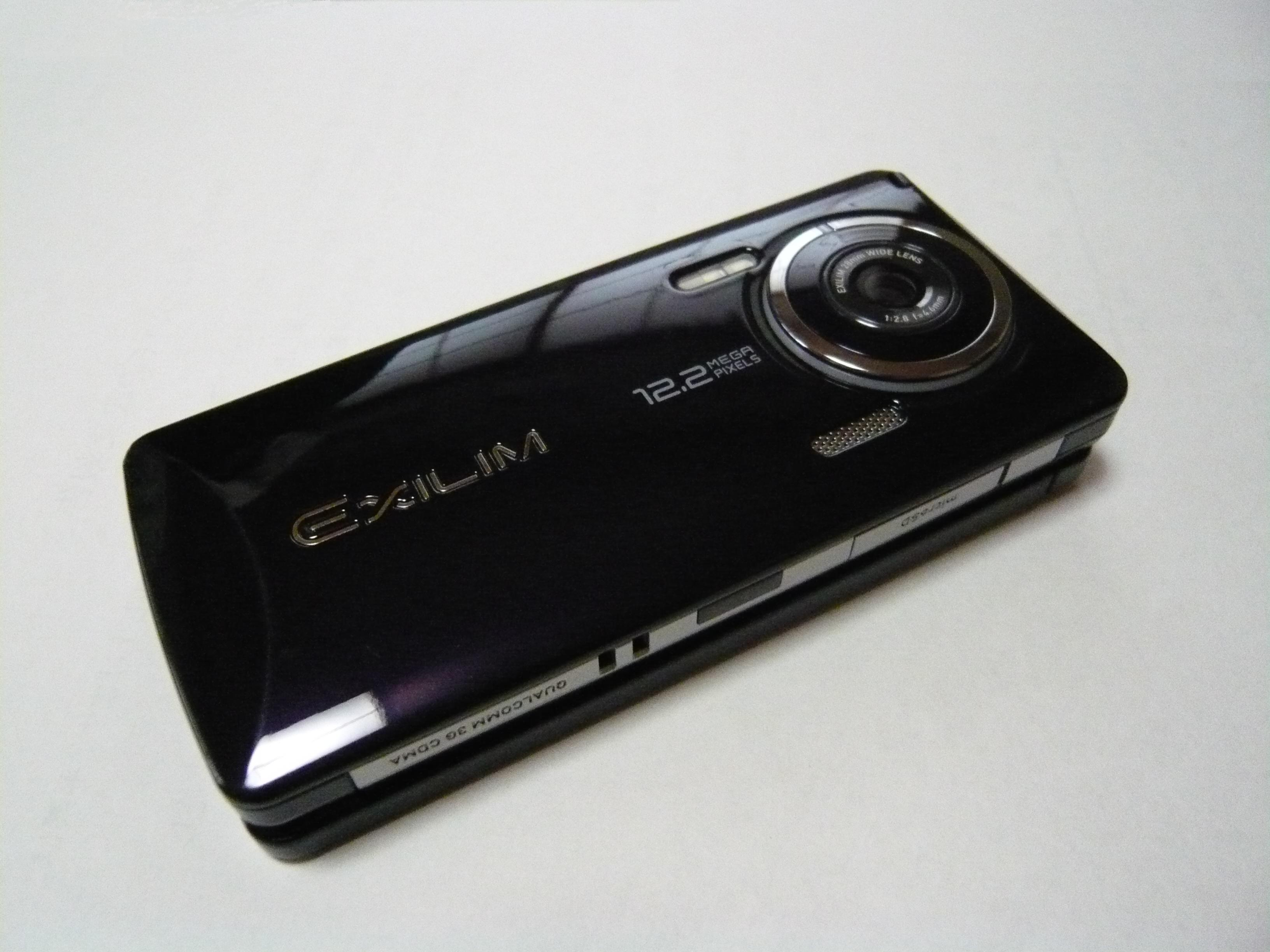
- CA003 (Dark Purple, rear view)
- Brand: au
- Manufacturer: Casio Hitachi Mobile Communications
- Type: Feature phone
- Series: EXILIM Keitai
- First released: November 14, 2009
- Discontinued: August 2010
- Predecessor: W63CA
- Successor: CA005
- Compatible networks: CDMA 1X WIN (Packet WIN) (CDMA2000 1xEV-DO Rel.0/Rev.A) (800 MHz/New 800 MHz/2 GHz)
- Form factor: 2-axis swivel flip
- Colors: Magenta Pink; Turquoise Green; Dark Purple; Champagne Gold
- Dimensions: 110 mm (4.3 in) H 50 mm (2.0 in) W 17.4 mm (0.69 in) D
- Weight: 135 g (4.8 oz)
- Operating system: KCP+
- CPU: Qualcomm MSM7500 (600 MHz)
- Storage: 500 MB
- Removable storage: microSD (up to 2 GB) microSDHC (up to 16 GB)
- Rear camera: 12.17 MP CMOS; Autofocus, image stabilization, face detection
- Front camera: None
- Display: 3.3 in (84 mm) Visual Full Wide VGA OLED; 240RGBG×854 pixels (pseudo-480×854 resolution); 260,000 colors
- Model: CA003

The EXILIM Keitai CA003 is a CDMA 1X WIN mobile phone developed by Casio Computer and Casio Hitachi Mobile Communications (now NEC) for the au brand operated by KDDI and Okinawa Cellular Telephone in Japan.

== Features ==
The high-end entry among two EXILIM Keitai devices announced for the 2009 winter lineup, the CA003 serves as the successor to the W63CA.

It is the first Casio-branded model for au to support microSDHC cards and features a 3.3-inch Visual Full Wide VGA (240RGBG×854 pixels, with pseudo-480×854 rendering capability) OLED display. Features adapted from the EXILIM digital camera brand include "Dynamic Photo", high-speed continuous shooting (up to 20 frames per second at 2MP resolution), and Auto Best Shot modes.

While previous EXILIM Keitai models like the W53CA and W63CA were styled to closely resemble dedicated digital cameras, the CA003 blends smartphone and camera design principles into a single unified aesthetic. The entire camera side serves as the battery cover, eliminating visible partition lines. The Turquoise Green and Dark Purple variants feature a wave-like pattern etched onto the rear display casing.

Au's KCP+ OS platform supported multitasking and dual-screen "Multi-Play Window" display modes. Beginning with select 2009 summer models, the "Quick Access Menu" was introduced. While other 2009 autumn/winter models dropped dual-screen support to cut development costs, the CA003 retained this feature, making it the final au feature phone capable of dual-screen simultaneous display.

== Camera ==
It features a 12.17-megapixel CMOS image sensor—the highest resolution in the EXILIM Keitai series at the time. It integrates a "EXILIM Engine for Mobile" for image processing.

== History ==
- July 17, 2009: Passed certification by the Japan Approval Institute for Telecommunications Equipment (JATE).
- October 19, 2009: Officially announced by KDDI and Casio Computer.
- October 29, 2009: Sales postponed from October 30 due to defective OLED display units in early production runs.
- November 14, 2009: Released in the Chubu, Kansai, and Okinawa regions.
- November 20, 2009: Released in Hokkaido, Hokuriku, Chugoku, and Shikoku regions.
- November 21, 2009: Released in all remaining regions.
- Late August 2010: Sales discontinued.
- March 31, 2022: Device rendered inoperable due to the shutdown of au's 3G network (CDMA 1X WIN).
