= Samsung Gear Fit =

2014 Fitness wristband by Samsung Electronics

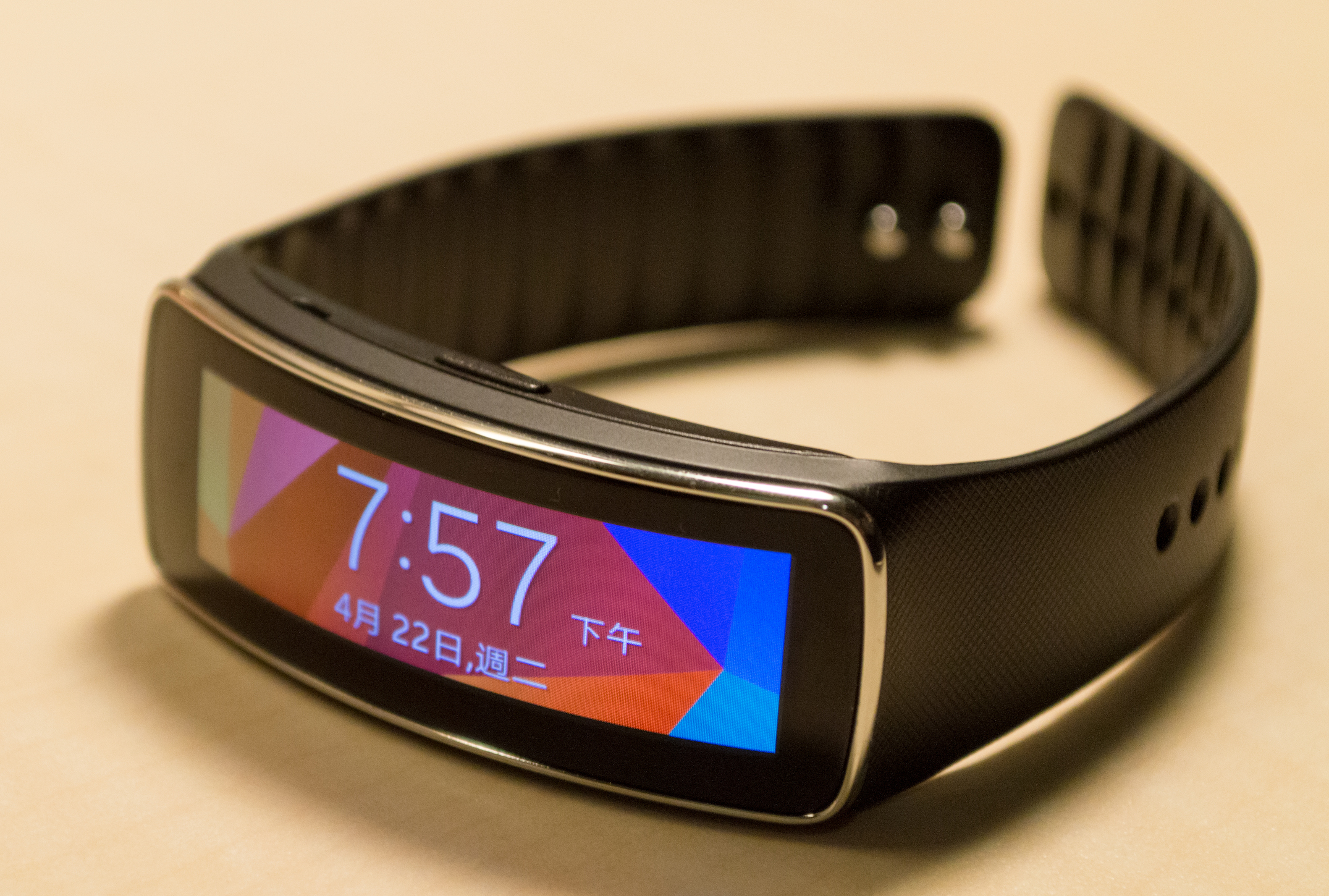
- Brand: Samsung
- Manufacturer: Samsung Electronics
- Type: fitness wristband smartwatch
- Family: Samsung Gear
- First released: April 11, 2014; 12 years ago
- Availability by region: April 11, 2014; 12 years ago
- Discontinued: June 2, 2016; 10 years ago
- Successor: Samsung Gear Fit 2
- Related: Samsung Gear 2
- Dimensions: 23.4 mm × 57.4 mm × 11.95 mm (0.92 in × 2.26 in × 0.47 in)
- Weight: 27 g (0.95 oz)
- Operating system: Proprietary RTOS
- CPU: 180 MHz ARM Cortex M4
- Battery: 210 mAh lithium-ion battery
- Display: Curved AMOLED, 47 mm (1.84 in) diagonal, 432 x 128 pixel
- Connectivity: Bluetooth Low Energy
- Website: samsung.com

The Samsung Gear Fit is a fitness wristband manufactured, developed and designed by Samsung Electronics, and forms part of their Samsung Gear family of smartwatch devices. It was announced on February 24, 2014, alongside the Galaxy S5 and the Gear 2 and the Gear 2 Neo at the Samsung Unpacked, and released to the market on April 11, 2014. At the Mobile World Congress the same week, the device was named "Best Mobile Device" by the GSMA.

The Gear Fit features a curved AMOLED display. Its design was developed to appeal to people interested in fitness and style. The included applications facilitate monitoring fitness activities:

- Heart Rate sensor
- Pedometer
- Exercise Standalone Modes: Running, Walking
- Companion Modes: Cycling, Hiking
- Sleep

Samsung stated that their Gear Fit is the "world's first" wearable device with a curved Super AMOLED touch display. In May 2015, the USPTO granted Samsung design patent D730,342 covering the Gear Fit's form factor. It is smaller and lighter than the Gear 2 and its Neo model, and is focused on health. It features a 1.84-inch Super AMOLED display with a 432x128 pixel resolution. The Gear Fit comes with a pedometer, heart rate monitor, and a sleep monitor.

A 210 mAh battery powers the Gear Fit, which gives a typical usage of 3 to 4 days and up to 5 days with low usage. The watch body measures 23.4 mm × 57.4 mm × 11.95 mm (0.92 in × 2.26 in × 0.47 in) and it weighs 27 g (0.95 oz).

On June 2, 2016, Samsung announced its new Gear Fit 2. The activity tracker is the follow-up to the original Gear Fit. The new wristband has an updated design, built-in GPS, and the ability to automatically recognize certain activities, an increasingly common feature in fitness bands and watches.
