= Samsung Z3 =

Smartphone model

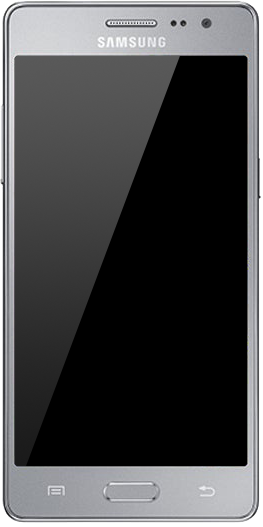
- Brand: Samsung
- Manufacturer: Samsung Electronics
- Type: Touchscreen smartphone
- Series: Z Series
- First released: 21 October 2015; 10 years ago
- Predecessor: Samsung Z2
- Compatible networks: GSM, HSPA
- Form factor: Slate
- Dimensions: 141.6 mm (5.57 in) H 70 mm (2.8 in) W 7.9 mm (0.31 in) D
- Weight: 137 g (4.8 oz)
- Operating system: Tizen 2.3
- System-on-chip: Spreadtrum SC7727S
- CPU: Quad-core 1.3 GHz cortex-A7
- GPU: Mali-400 MP2
- Memory: 1 GB RAM
- Storage: 8 GB
- Removable storage: Up to 128 GB microSDXCs
- Battery: 2600 mAh Li-ion
- Rear camera: 8 MP, f/2.2, autofocus, LED flash
- Front camera: 5 MP, f/2.2
- Display: 5" Super Amoled; 720 x 1280 HD (294 ppi)
- Connectivity: Wi-Fi 802.11 b/g/n, Wi-Fi Direct, Bluetooth 4, USB 2.0, USB On-The-Go, FM radio, GPS
- Data inputs: Multi-touch touchscreen
- Website: www.samsung.com/in/microsite/z3/

The Samsung Z3 is a smartphone produced by Samsung. It is the second smartphone to be shipped with the Tizen operating system (after the Samsung Z1). The phone was released on October 21, 2015.

The phone was succeeded by the Samsung Z2 in August 2016.
