= Tizen =

Linux-based mobile operating system

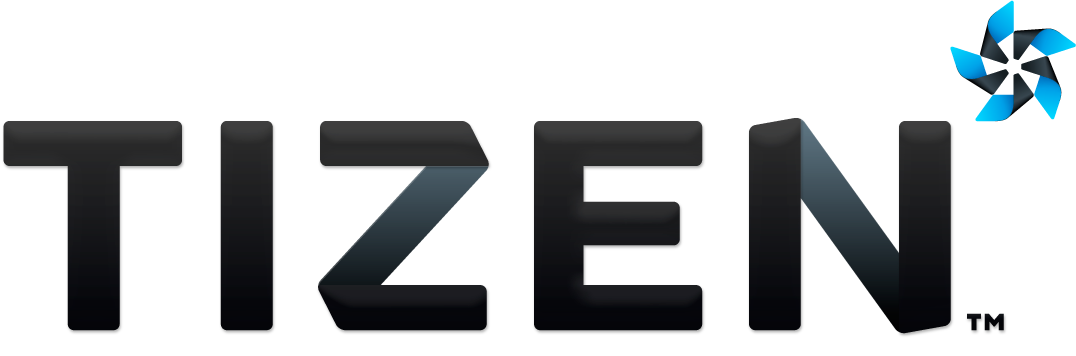
- Developer: Linux Foundation; Samsung Electronics
- Written in: HTML5, C, C++
- OS family: Linux (Unix-like)
- Working state: Current
- Source model: Open source with source-available and proprietary components
- Initial release: April 30, 2012; 14 years ago
- Latest release: 10.0 / 31 October 2025; 12 months ago
- Repository: review.tizen.org/git/
- Marketing target: Smart TVs, embedded systems, previously: smartwatches and smartphones
- Package manager: RPM Package Manager
- Supported platforms: ARM, ARM64, x86, and x86-64
- Kernel type: Monolithic (Linux)
- Userland: GNU
- Default user interface: Graphical (native and web applications), One UI for Smartwatch, Television and Smartphone
- License: Operating system: GPLv2, LGPL, Apache License 2.0, BSD, Flora License; SDK: Freeware
- Preceded by: MeeGo (project-wise); Orsay (smart televisions); Bada (smartphones); Android (smartwatches and smart fridges)
- Succeeded by: Wear OS (smartwatches); Android (smartphones)
- Official website: tizen.org, samsungtizenos.com

Support status
- Supported

Tizen (/ˈtaɪzɛn/) is a Linux-based operating system primarily developed by Samsung Electronics and Linux Foundation.

The project was originally conceived as an HTML5-based platform for mobile devices to succeed MeeGo. It was backed by other companies under the Tizen Association. Samsung merged its previous Linux-based OS effort, Bada, into Tizen and has since used it primarily on platforms such as smart TVs and wearable devices (until 2021).

Much of Tizen is open-source software, although the software development kit contains proprietary components owned by Samsung, and portions of the OS are licensed under the Flora License, a derivative of the Apache License 2.0 that grants a patent license only to "Tizen-certified platforms".

In May 2021, Google announced that Samsung would partner with the company on integrating Tizen features into Google's Android-derived Wear OS and committed to using it on future wearables, leaving Tizen to be mainly developed for Samsung Smart TVs.

== History ==
Tizen and the mobile software distributions it is related to

The project was initiated as mobile Linux and was launched by Intel in July 2007. In April 2009 the operating system updated to version 2.0 which was based on Fedora. However, in the same month, Intel turned Moblin over to the Linux Foundation for future development. Eventually, the operating system was merged with Nokia Maemo, a Debian-based Linux distro, into MeeGo which was mainly developed by Nokia, Intel and Linux Foundation.

In 2011, after Nokia abandoned the project, Linux Foundation initiated the Tizen project as a successor to MeeGo, another Linux-based mobile operating system. Its main backer, Intel, joined Samsung Electronics, Access Co., NEC Casio, NTT DoCoMo, Panasonic Mobile, SK Telecom, Telefónica, and Vodafone as commercial partners. Tizen would be designed to use HTML5 apps and target mobile and embedded platforms such as netbooks, smartphones, tablets, smart TVs, and in-car entertainment systems. U.S. carrier Sprint Corporation (which was a backer of MeeGo) joined the Tizen Association in May 2012. On September 16, 2012, Automotive Grade Linux announced its intent to use Tizen as the basis of its reference distribution.

In January 2013, Samsung announced its intent to release multiple Tizen-based phones that year. In February 2013, Samsung merged its Bada operating system into Tizen.

In October 2013, the first Tizen tablet was shipped by Systena. The tablet was part of a development kit exclusive to Japan.

In 2014, Samsung released the Gear 2 smartwatch, which used a Tizen-based operating system rather than Android.

On May 14, 2014, it was announced that Tizen would ship with Qt. This project was abandoned in January 2017.

On February 21, 2016, Samsung announced Samsung Connect Auto, a connected car solution offering diagnostic, Wi-Fi, and other car-connected services. The device plugs directly into the OBD-II port underneath the steering wheel.

On November 16, 2016, Samsung said they would be collaborating with Microsoft to bring .NET Core support to Tizen.

According to Strategy Analytics research, approximately 21% of the smart TVs sold in 2018 run on the Tizen platform, which made it the most popular smart TV platform.

On May 19, 2021, during Google I/O, Google announced that Samsung had agreed to work on integrating features of Tizen with the next version of Wear OS, and that it had committed to using Wear OS for its future wearable products. Samsung would continue to use Tizen for its smart TVs.

On December 31, 2021, the Tizen app store permanently closed. The last smartphone based on the Tizen operating system is the Samsung Z4, which was released in 2017. The company switched to Google's Wear OS 3 platform on its Galaxy Watch 4 smartwatches.

As of August 2025, Samsung Smart TVs run on Tizen, with OTA [Over The Air] updates rolled out as and when Samsung releases them.

== Releases ==
- Tizen 1.0: April 30, 2012
- Tizen 2.0: February 18, 2013
- Tizen 2.1: May 18, 2013
- Tizen 2.2: July 22, 2013
  - Tizen 2.2.1: November 9, 2013
- Tizen 2.3: February 9, 2015
  - Tizen 2.3.1: September 3, 2015
    - Tizen 2.3.1 Rev1: November 13, 2015
  - Tizen 2.3.2: September 3, 2016
    - Tizen 2.3.2 Patch: December 23, 2016
- Tizen 2.4: October 30, 2015
  - Tizen 2.4 Rev1: December 1, 2015
  - Tizen 2.4 Rev2: December 23, 2015
  - Tizen 2.4 Rev3: February 5, 2016
  - Tizen 2.4 Rev4: March 4, 2016
  - Tizen 2.4 Rev5: April 4, 2016
  - Tizen 2.4 Rev6: May 19, 2016
  - Tizen 2.4 Rev7: June 30, 2016
  - Tizen 2.4 Rev8: August 2, 2016
- Tizen 3.0: January 18, 2017
  - Tizen IVI 3.0 (In-Vehicle Infotainment): April 22, 2014
  - Tizen 3.0 Milestones (M1): September 17, 2015
  - Tizen 3.0 Public M2: January 18, 2017
  - Tizen 3.0 Public M3: July 5, 2017
  - Tizen 3.0 Public M4: November 30, 2017
- Tizen 4.0: May 31, 2017
  - Tizen 4.0 Public M1: May 31, 2017
  - Tizen 4.0 Public M2: November 1, 2017
  - Tizen 4.0 Public M3: August 31, 2018
- Tizen 5.0: May 31, 2018
  - Tizen 5.0 Public M1: May 31, 2018
  - Tizen 5.0 Public M2: October 30, 2018
- Tizen 5.5: May 31, 2019
  - Tizen 5.5 Public M1: May 31, 2019
  - Tizen 5.5 Public M2: October 30, 2019
  - Tizen 5.5 Public M3: August 27, 2020
- Tizen 6.0: May 31, 2020
  - Tizen 6.0 Public M1: May 31, 2020
  - Tizen 6.0 Public M2: October 27, 2020
- Tizen 6.5: May 31, 2021
  - Tizen 6.5 Public M1: May 31, 2021
  - Tizen 6.5 Public M2: October 31, 2021
- Tizen 7.0: May 31, 2022
  - Tizen 7.0 Public M1: May 31, 2022
  - Tizen 7.0 Public M2: October 31, 2022
- Tizen 8.0: May 31, 2023
  - Tizen 8.0 Public M1: May 31, 2023
  - Tizen 8.0 Public M2: October 31, 2023
- Tizen 9.0: May 31, 2024
  - Tizen 9.0 Public M1: May 31, 2024
  - Tizen 9.0 Public M2: October 31, 2024
- Tizen 10.0: October 31, 2025
  - Tizen 10.0 Public: October 31, 2025

== Compatible devices ==
=== Smartwatches ===
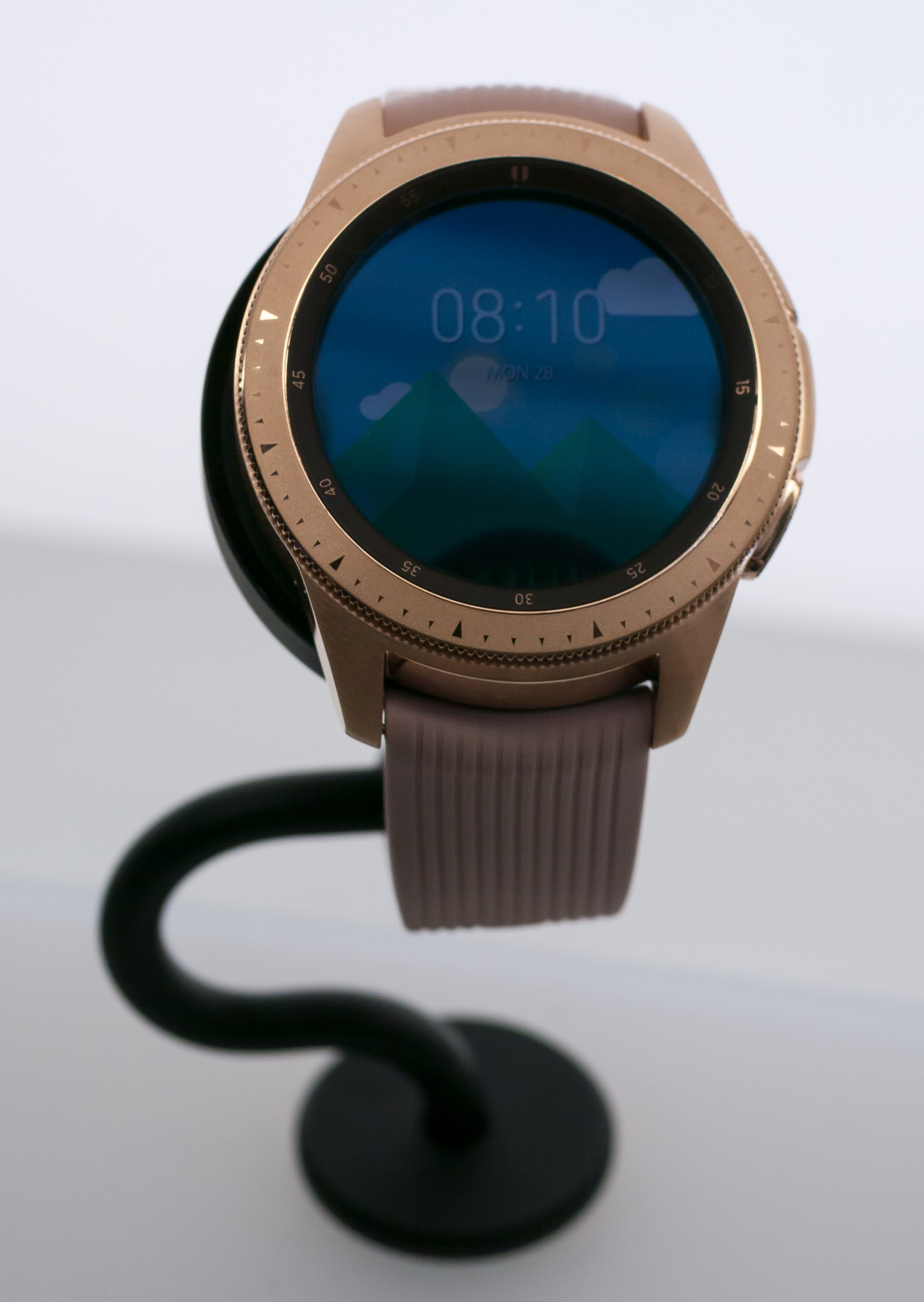
Samsung Galaxy Watch running Tizen

- Samsung Galaxy Gear
- Samsung Gear S
- Samsung Gear S2
- Samsung Gear S3
- Samsung Gear 2
- Samsung Gear Fit 2
- Samsung Gear Fit 2 Pro
- Samsung Gear Sport
- Samsung Galaxy Watch
- Samsung Galaxy Watch Active
- Samsung Galaxy Watch Active 2
- Samsung Galaxy Watch 3

=== Camera ===
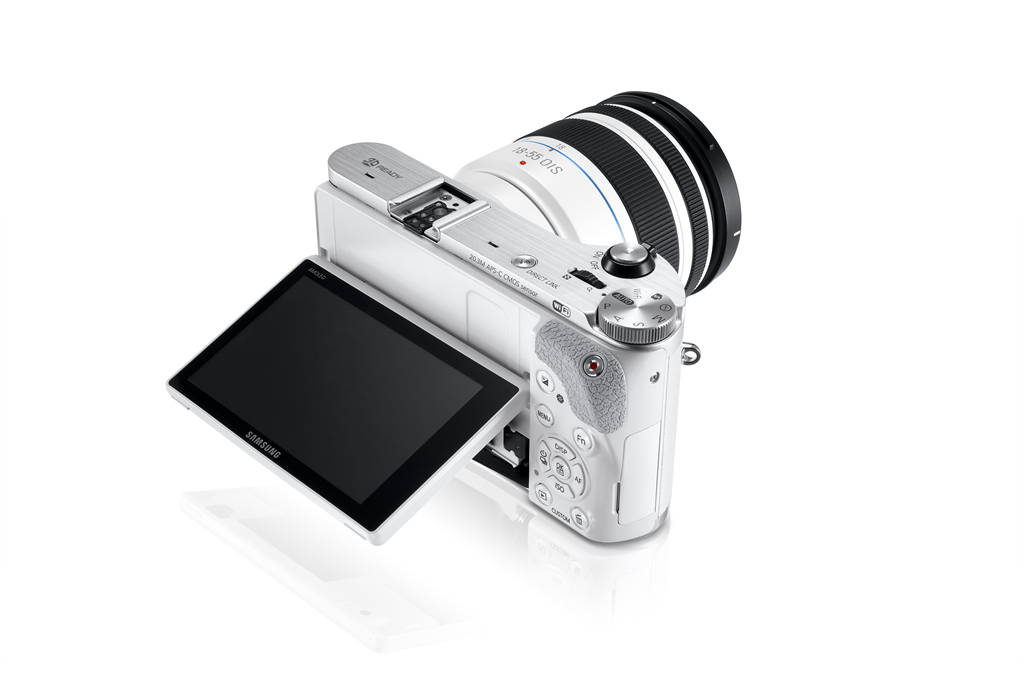
NX300 camera running Tizen

- Samsung NX2000
- Samsung NX300
- Samsung NX1
- Samsung NX30
- Samsung NX500
- Samsung Gear 360

=== Smartphone ===
Samsung Z was a series of low-cost smartphones for emerging markets. The first smartphone in the line was launched in 2015 and the last one in 2017.

- Samsung Z1
- Samsung Z2
- Samsung Z3
- Samsung Z4

Never released developer phones (codename Redwood)

- GT-i9500 (later this code was given to Samsung Galaxy S IV, not to confuse with it)
- GT-i8800/GT-i8805 (Dual Sim)
- SM-Z9000/SM-Z9005 (Dual Sim)

There was also Samsung S III Tizen variant, codename RD-PQ, which was distributed to developers who created apps for Tizen

=== Television ===
- Samsung Smart TVs since 2015
- Loewe Smart TVs since 2024
- Bauhn Smart TVs since 2022
- Akai Smart TVs since 2022
- Linsar Smart TVs since 2022

=== Appliances ===
- Family Hub 1.0 Refrigerator
- Family Hub 2.0 Refrigerator
- Family Hub 3.0 Refrigerator
- Family Hub 4.0 Refrigerator
- Family Hub 5.0 Refrigerator
- Family Hub 6.0 Refrigerator
- Family Hub 7.0 Refrigerator
- Family Hub 8.0 Refrigerator

=== LED Wall controllers ===
- SBB-SNOWJ3U

== Controversies ==
On April 3, 2017, Vice reported on its "Motherboard" website that Amihai Neiderman, an Israeli security expert, has found more than 40 zero-day vulnerabilities in Tizen's code, allowing hackers to remotely access a wide variety of current Samsung products running Tizen, such as Smart TVs and mobile phones. After the article was published, Samsung, whom Neiderman tried to contact months before, reached out to him to resolve the issues.

== TizenRT ==
In December 2016, Samsung created TizenRT, a fork of NuttX, a real-time operating system (RTOS), for smart home appliances and IoT devices.

== See also ==
- Comparison of mobile operating systems
- List of smart TV platforms
- KaiOS, an OS for small screen, low power mobile phones
- Sailfish OS
- Facer (app)
