= Samsung Gear Fit 2 =

Fitness smartwatch

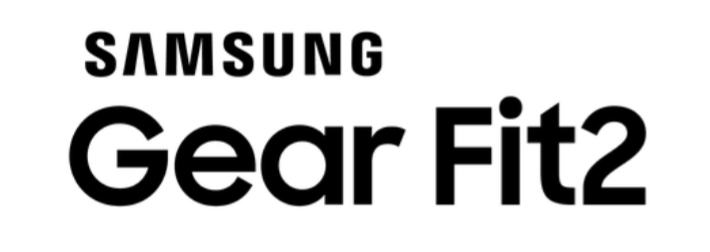
- Developer: Samsung Electronics
- Manufacturer: Samsung Electronics
- Product family: Samsung Gear
- Type: Fitness wristband, smartwatch
- Released: June 2, 2016
- Operating system: Tizen
- CPU: Dual Core 1GHz (Exynos 3250)
- Storage: 4 GB
- Display: Curved AMOLED, 38 mm (1.5 in) diagonal, 216 x 432 pixel
- Power: 200mAh lithium-ion battery
- Predecessor: Samsung Gear Fit
- Successor: Samsung Gear Fit 2 Pro
- Website: www.samsung.com

The Samsung Gear Fit2 is a fitness smartwatch made by Samsung Electronics. The product is made in China. Unveiled in June 2016, the Gear Fit2 is the successor to the Samsung Gear Fit released in 2014.

Compared to the Gear Fit the new wristband has an updated design, built-in GPS, and the ability to automatically recognize different fitness activities. The Gear Fit2 features a barometer and heart rate monitor. It is compatible with Android phones running OS 4.4 or later.

== Gear Fit 2 Pro ==
The successor to the Gear Fit 2 is the Gear Fit2 Pro, released in 2017. It is water-resistant and has improvements related to underwater activity.
