= Flora License =

Software license

- Latest version: 1.1
- Published: April 2013
- Debian FSG compatible: No
- FSF approved: No
- OSI approved: No
- GPL compatible: No
- Copyleft: No
- Linking from code with a different licence: Yes
- Website: floralicense.org

Flora License is a single purpose permissive software license used by the Linux Foundation in certain platform components of Tizen.

== Licensing conditions ==
The text of Flora License Version 1.0 is similar to Apache License 2.0 without Apache's general patent license, having a patent license only for the "Tizen Certified Platform".

Some of the differences include changed text in the Definitions, Grant of Patent License, and Redistribution sections. Paragraph 4 regarding the redistribution is comparable to standard BSD licenses:

4. Redistribution. You may reproduce and distribute copies of the Work or Derivative Works thereof pursuant to the copyright license above, in any medium, with or without modifications, and in Source or Object form, provided that You meet the following conditions:

  1. You must give any other recipients of the Work or Derivative Works a copy of this License; and

  2. You must cause any modified files to carry prominent notices stating that You changed the files; and

  3. You must retain, in the Source form of any Derivative Works that You distribute, all copyright, patent, trademark, and attribution notices from the Source form of the Work, excluding those notices that do not pertain to any part of the Derivative Works;

Webinos wrote in its Open Governance white paper, October 2012 that “there are no formal limitations with regard to obtaining the source code and creating derivatives thereof”.

It only grants patents to Tizen Certified Platforms that pass the Tizen Association's compatibility test. Therefore, it is likely not compatible with requirements of the Open Source Initiative.

== History ==
The Flora license was released in May 2012 as part of version 1.0 (Larkspur) of Tizen. It covers some user-facing applications such as boot animation, a calendar, music player, the task manager, and more.

== See also ==
- Tizen
- Comparison of free and open-source software licenses
- Linux Foundation
