= Samsung Z4 =

Samsung smartphone

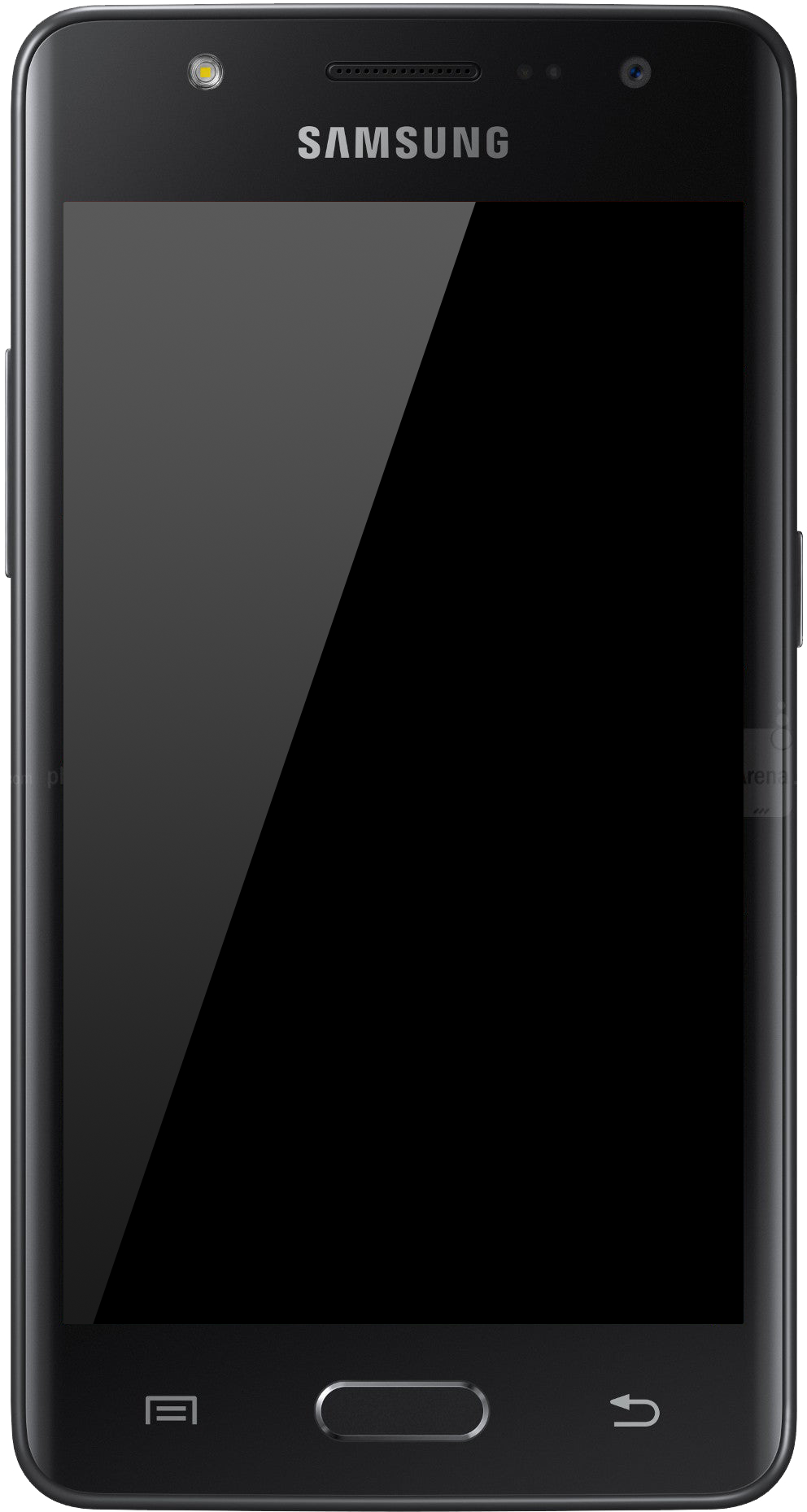
Z4

The Samsung Z4 smartphone is a Samsung product released in June 2017.

== Specifications ==
- 4.50 inch display with 480 x 800 pixels
- 1.5 GHz quad-core processor
- 1 GB RAM
- 8 GB storage (can be expanded up to an additional 128GB via microSD card)
- 5 megapixel rear camera
- 5 megapixel front camera
- 2050 mAh battery
- 132.90 mm x 69.20 mm x 10.30 mm (height x width x thickness)
- 143.00 grams weight
- Dual SIM
- Tizen 3.0 OS

== See also ==
- Samsung
- Android
