= Garage Sale =

Garage Sale may refer to:

- A garage sale
- Garage Sale (That '70s Show), an episode of That '70s Show
- Garage Sale, a half-episode of Rugrats (see List of Rugrats episodes)
- Kesey's Garage Sale
- Garage Sale (owarai), the Japanese comedy duo.
- Garage Sale (The Office), episode of The Office.
- "Yard Sale" (Cow and Chicken), an episode of Cow and Chicken
