= Samsung Z1 =

2015 smartphone by Samsung Electronics

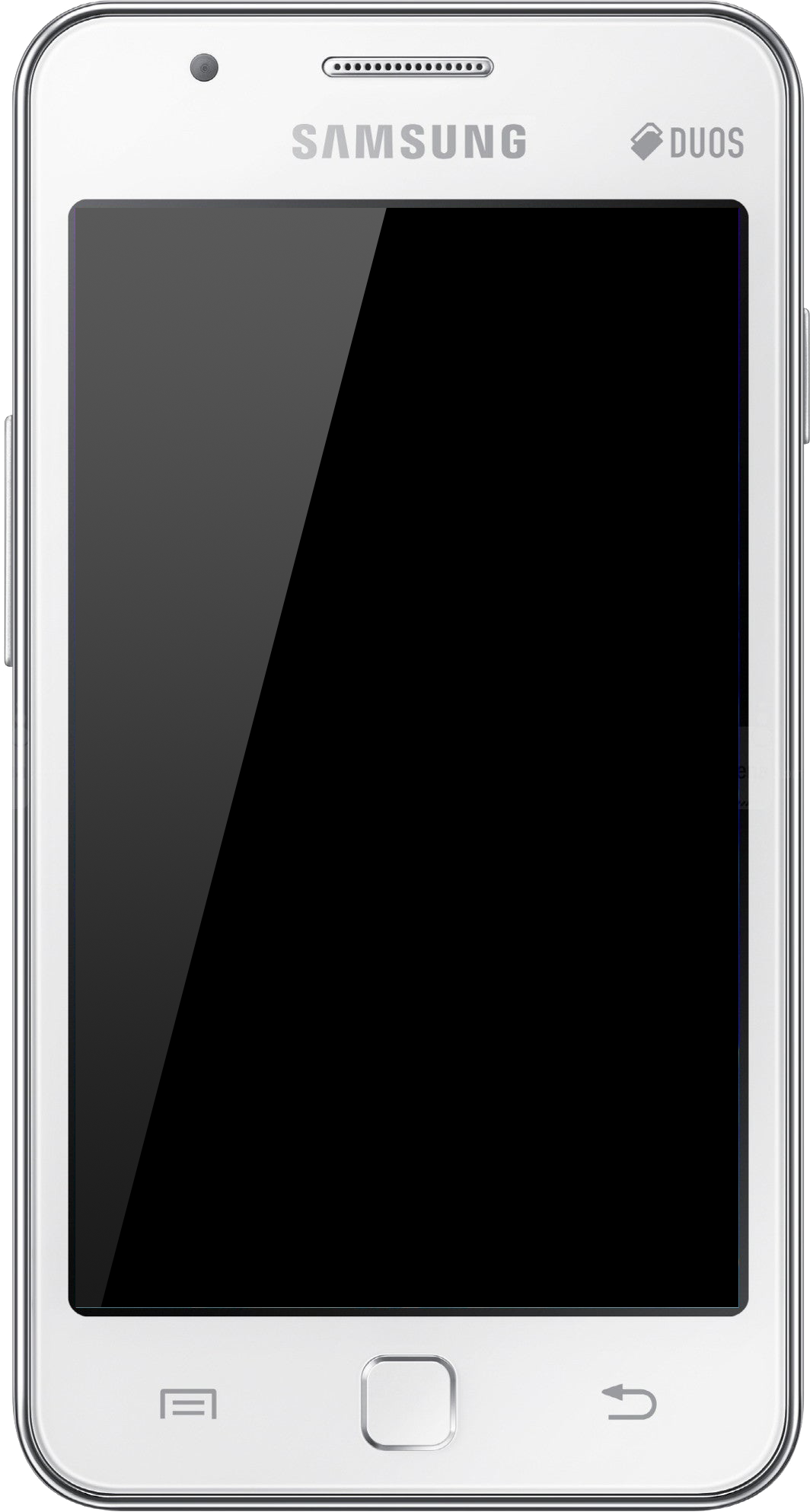
- Brand: Samsung
- Manufacturer: Samsung Electronics
- Type: Touchscreen smartphone
- Series: Z Series
- First released: 14 January 2015; 11 years ago
- Availability by region: India: January 2015; Bangladesh: February 2015; Sri Lanka: May 2015
- Compatible networks: 2.5G, 3G
- Form factor: Slate
- Dimensions: 100.4 mm (3.95 in) H 63.2 mm (2.49 in) W 9.7 mm (0.38 in) D
- Weight: 112 g (4.0 oz)
- Operating system: Tizen 2.3
- System-on-chip: Spreadtrum SC7727S
- CPU: Dual-core 1.2 GHz Cortex A7
- GPU: Mali-400MP
- Memory: 768 MB RAM
- Storage: 4 GB
- Removable storage: Up to 64 GB microSDXC
- Battery: 1500 mAh Li-ion
- Rear camera: 3.15 megapixels
- Front camera: 0.3 MP
- Display: 4" (100mm) PLS TFT 480×800 WVGA (233 ppi)
- Connectivity: Wi-Fi, Bluetooth 4, USB 2.0 (Micro-B port, USB charging)
- Data inputs: GPS
- Codename: KIRAN
- Website: www.samsung.com/in/z1/

The Samsung Z1 is a smartphone created by Samsung Electronics. It runs Samsung's own Tizen, a Linux-based operating system that was an alternative to Android.

It was released in India in January 2015, Bangladesh in February 2015 and Sri Lanka in May 2015.

The phone was succeeded by the Samsung Z3 in October 2015.

== Specifications ==
=== Hardware ===
The Samsung Z1 features a 480×800 WVGA PLS TFT 4-inch display with a pixel density of 233 pixels-per-inch.

It has a 1.2 GHz dual-core ARM Cortex-A7 processor, 768 MB RAM, 4 GB of storage (with option for up to 64 GB of additional storage via microSDXC card) and a 1500 mAh battery.

The rear-facing camera is 3.15 megapixels with LED flash. The front-facing camera is 0.3 megapixels. The phone can record VGA (640×480) videos at 15fps.

=== Software ===
The Samsung Z1 comes with Samsung's own mobile operating system Tizen. The UI was specifically designed for users who were upgrading from feature phones to smartphones.

=== Sales ===
By June 2015 Samsung sold 1 million units.
