= NEC Mobile Communications =

Japanese mobile phone manufacturer

- Company type: Joint venture (2010–2013); Subsidiary of NEC (2013–2016)
- Predecessor: Casio Hitachi Mobile Communications
- Founded: May 1, 2010
- Defunct: March 2016
- Fate: Dissolved
- Successor: NEC Corporation (mobile phone business)
- Headquarters: Kawasaki, Kanagawa, Japan
- Area served: Japan, South Korea, worldwide
- Products: Mobile phones, smartphones, tablets
- Owners: NEC (70.74%); Casio (20.00%); Hitachi (9.26%) (2010–2013)
- Parent: NEC (2013–2016)

NEC Mobile Communications was a mobile phone manufacturer established 1 May 2010. It started as a joint venture among three Japanese electronics manufacturers NEC, Casio and Hitachi, where NEC owned 70.74%, Casio 20.00% and Hitachi 9.26%. At one point, the company was the second largest maker of mobile terminals in Japan. The company headquarters was in Kawasaki, Kanagawa. The company dissolved in March 2016.

== History ==
The company was formed as NEC Casio Mobile Communications as a result of a merger between the mobile handset division of NEC and the former joint venture between Casio and Hitachi, Casio Hitachi Mobile Communications, established 1 April 2004.

After seeing declining shares in domestic market, NEC Casio announced its withdrawal from smartphone manufacturing business in July 2013. Then in December 2013, Casio and Hitachi sold their stake in the company to NEC, making it a fully owned subsidiary of NEC. The company renamed to NEC Mobile Communications in October 2014.

In December 2015, NEC announced that it will acquire all mobile phone business from NEC Mobile Communications at March 2016. The company was dissolved shortly after.

== Products ==
- MEDIAS smartphone line (domestic market)
- Gz'One featurephone and smartphone line (domestic, international markets)
- EXILIM featurephones
- CanU featurephones (South Korean market)
- Medias Tab tablets
