= Pebble Time =

Smartwatch developed by Pebble technology

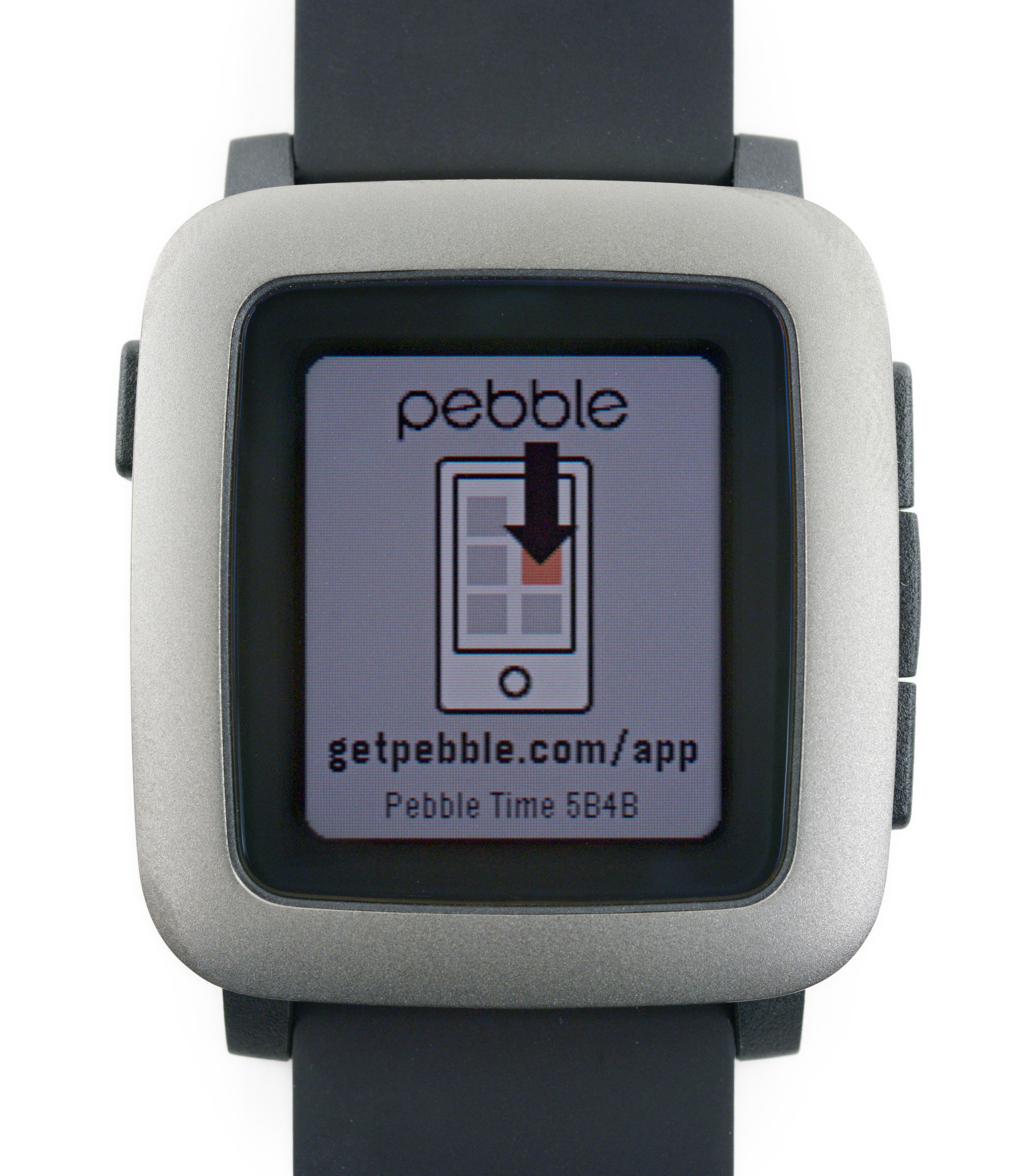
- Pebble Time in black/silver
- Developer: Pebble Technology
- Product family: Pebble
- Type: Smartwatch
- Generation: 2
- Released: May 24, 2015 (Pebble Time); August 6, 2015 (Pebble Time Steel)
- Introductory price: $149 (Pebble Time) $249 (Pebble Time Steel) $199 (Pebble Time Round) $179 (Pebble Time 2)
- Operating system: Pebble OS, with a customized FreeRTOS kernel (v. 3.0)
- CPU: 100 MHz, Cortex-M4
- Storage: 16 MiB
- Display: 64-color LED backlit Sharp Memory LCD "e-paper" display Rectangular, 1.25 in, 144x168 px, 182 ppi (Both Pebble Time and Pebble Time Steel); Round, 1 in, 180x180 px, 182 ppi (Pebble Time Round)
- Graphics: 6-bit (64 colors)
- Sound: No speaker
- Input: Three-axis accelerometer, ambient light sensor, compass, magnetometer, pedometer, and microphone
- Controller input: Four buttons
- Camera: No camera
- Touchpad: No touchscreen display
- Connectivity: Bluetooth 4.0
- Power: Lithium-ion battery (7 days max for Pebble Time, 10 days max for Pebble Time Steel)
- Dimensions: 47.1 mm × 37.5 mm × 9.5 mm (1.85 in × 1.48 in × 0.37 in) (Pebble Time); 47 mm × 37.5 mm × 10.5 mm (1.85 in × 1.48 in × 0.41 in) (Pebble Time Steel); 38.1 mm × 38.1 mm × 7.6 mm (1.50 in × 1.50 in × 0.30 in) (Pebble Time Round)
- Weight: 1.50 oz (42.5 g) (Pebble Time); 2.20 oz (62.3 g) (Pebble Time Steel); 0.99 oz (28 g) (Pebble Time Round)
- Predecessor: Pebble (Both normal and Steel variants)
- Website: pebble.com

Pebble Time is a smartwatch originally developed by Pebble Technology and assembled by Foxlink, released on 14 May 2015. Pebble Time was the first Pebble watch to introduce a color e-paper display, as well as a microphone, a new charging cable and a new Pebble Time-optimized operating system.

In early 2015, Pebble announced the product, as well as its fundraising on Kickstarter. The watch received $1M in 49 minutes, breaking a current record, and was the most funded Kickstarter campaign from March 2015 to March 2022, raising $20.4M from over 78,741 backers.

Pebble ceased operating in June 2018, with the technology sold to Fitbit. In 2025, Core Devices, a company led by original Pebble founder Eric Migicovsky, recovered the Pebble trademark and announced a successor to the Pebble Time, named Pebble Time 2.

== History ==
=== Development ===
After releasing the Pebble smartwatch, Pebble CEO Eric Migicovsky announced the Pebble Time, the second generation smartwatch of Pebble.

=== Funding ===
The project was established on Kickstarter, a crowdsourcing website, and reached its goal ($500K) in 17 minutes, $1M in 49 minutes, $10.3M in 2 days, breaking another Kickstarter goal, and finally earning $20.4M by its deadline on 3 March 2015, making it the most funded Kickstarter project to date. Until March 2022, the Pebble Time Smartwatch was officially the most successful campaign on Kickstarter, with almost 80,000 backers pledging $20 million.

== Features ==
Pebble's smartwatches connect to both Android and iOS phones, and using a Bluetooth connection, run native apps that control music on the connected smartphone, display calendars, show fitness/sleep data from Pebble Health, and allow users to set timers. Pebble also has an app store where users can download apps from companies including RunKeeper, ESPN, Uber, Nest, TripAdvisor, Pandora Radio, and Yelp onto their watches. Users can also respond to text messages with the Pebble's microphone, check the weather, create checklists, make voice notes, and view Google Maps directions.

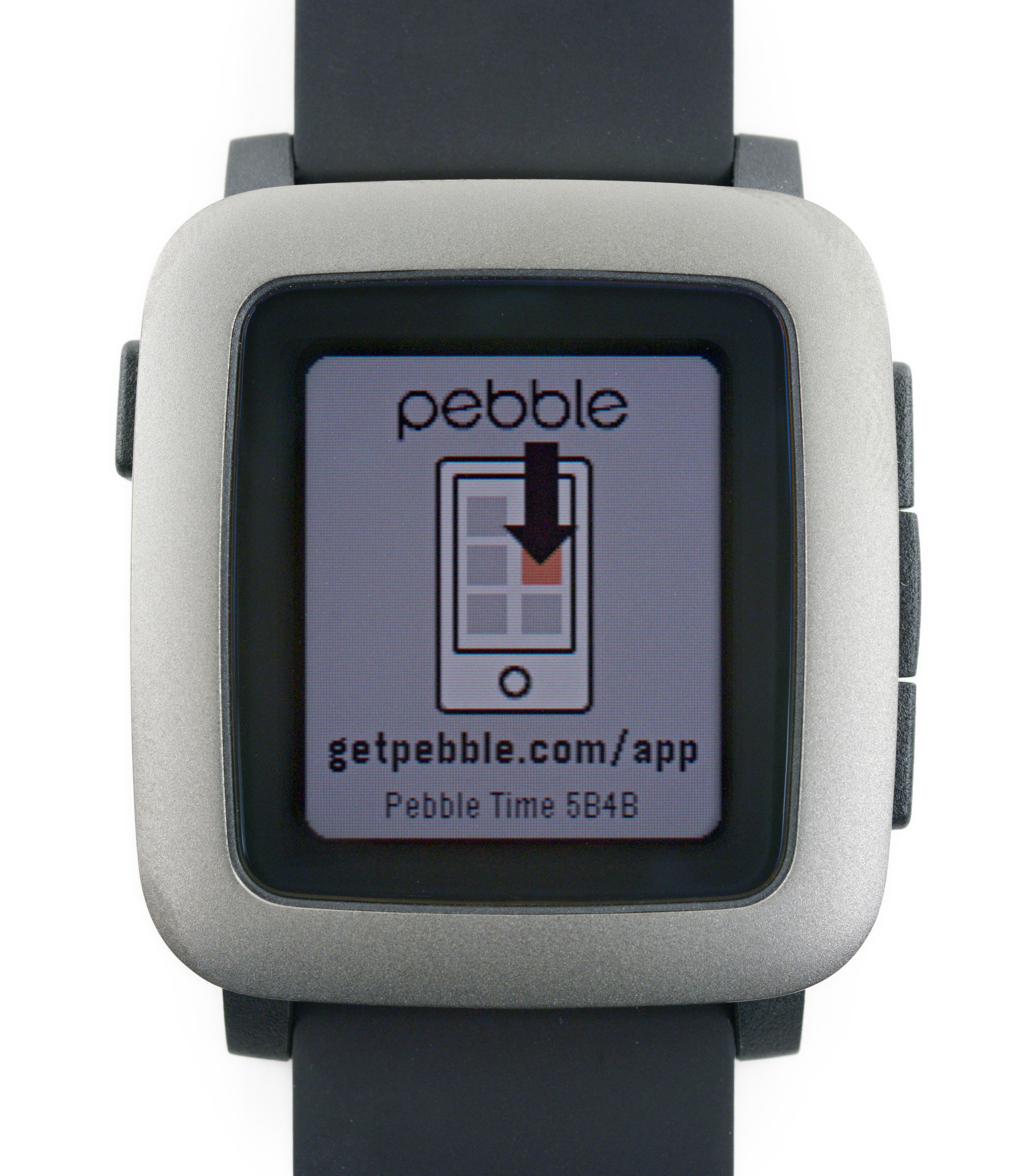
The Pebble Time in grey, showing initial screen out-of-box

=== Software ===
Pebble Time uses Pebble OS version 3.0. This OS is compatible with its color e-paper display. The OS features updated transitions between screens which "morph" into other features due to the constrained space of the watch's face. The OS version is also backward compatible with other features in previous versions of Pebble OS. It works with apps, watchfaces, and settings tailored for Pebble OS v. 2 or lower, as well as its predecessors. Pebble Time still retains most of the features from the original Pebble smartwatch, such as Bluetooth connectivity, and is currently only compatible with the smartwatch itself.

Timeline is a new feature on Pebble OS 3, which currently is only compatible with Pebble Time. It enables the wearer to look at past and future notes, either reminders, alarms, app notifications, scores, weather reports or others. The completed or viewed notifications, ESPN scores, and calendar events are in the "past" section, which is highlighted yellow. The future calendar events, weather reports, or reminders are in the "future" section, which is highlighted blue. To access either, the wearer uses the buttons to look at desired information.

=== Hardware ===
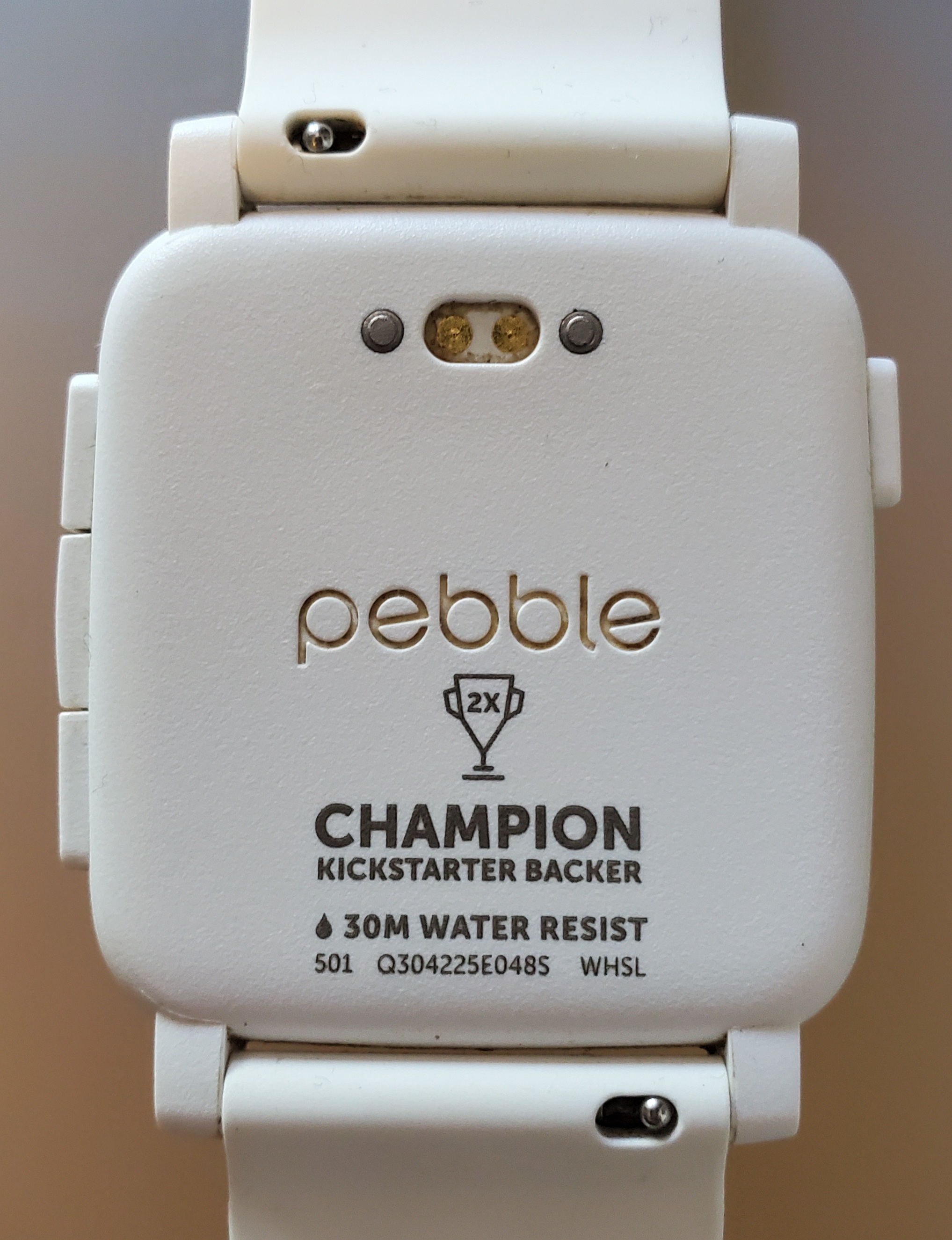
Pebble Time back in white, 2X Champion edition for people who supported both of the first 2 Kickstarters

The smartwatch comes with a Gorilla Glass 64-color e-paper always-on display developed by JDI with 144x168 resolution and has a pixel density of 182 ppi. This is the first Pebble smartwatch to have a color display, and still retains a LED backlight as well. The watch also has a vibrating motor for silent alarms, and smart notifications. The watch comes with a redesigned charging cable that, like its predecessor's cable, magnetically attaches itself to the watch in order to maintain its water resistance. Unlike its predecessor, the cable attaches to the back of the watch rather than the side, and has the potential to transfer data rather than just power. The band attaches with standard 22 mm pins. The watch is also equipped with an ambient light sensor and 6 axis accelerometer.

=== "Smartstraps" ===
Pebble Time, as a feature, has a small accessory port on the back of the watchface. Pebble Technology, Corp announced on its developer site that it is possible to create accessory ports on watchbands, otherwise known as "smartstraps". It enables the wearer to attach additional equipment to the watch, including sensors, batteries, and miscellaneous. As a hazard, the "smartstraps" will affect the watch's battery life. As of summer 2015, the "smartstrap" API is still in beta testing. Two smartstraps were funded on Kickstarter so far: the Pagaré strap, which gives Apple Pay-like contactless payment features to the Pebble, and the Tylt Vü strap, which gives Qi capabilities to the Pebble, as well as heart rate measurement.

== Variants ==
=== Time Steel ===
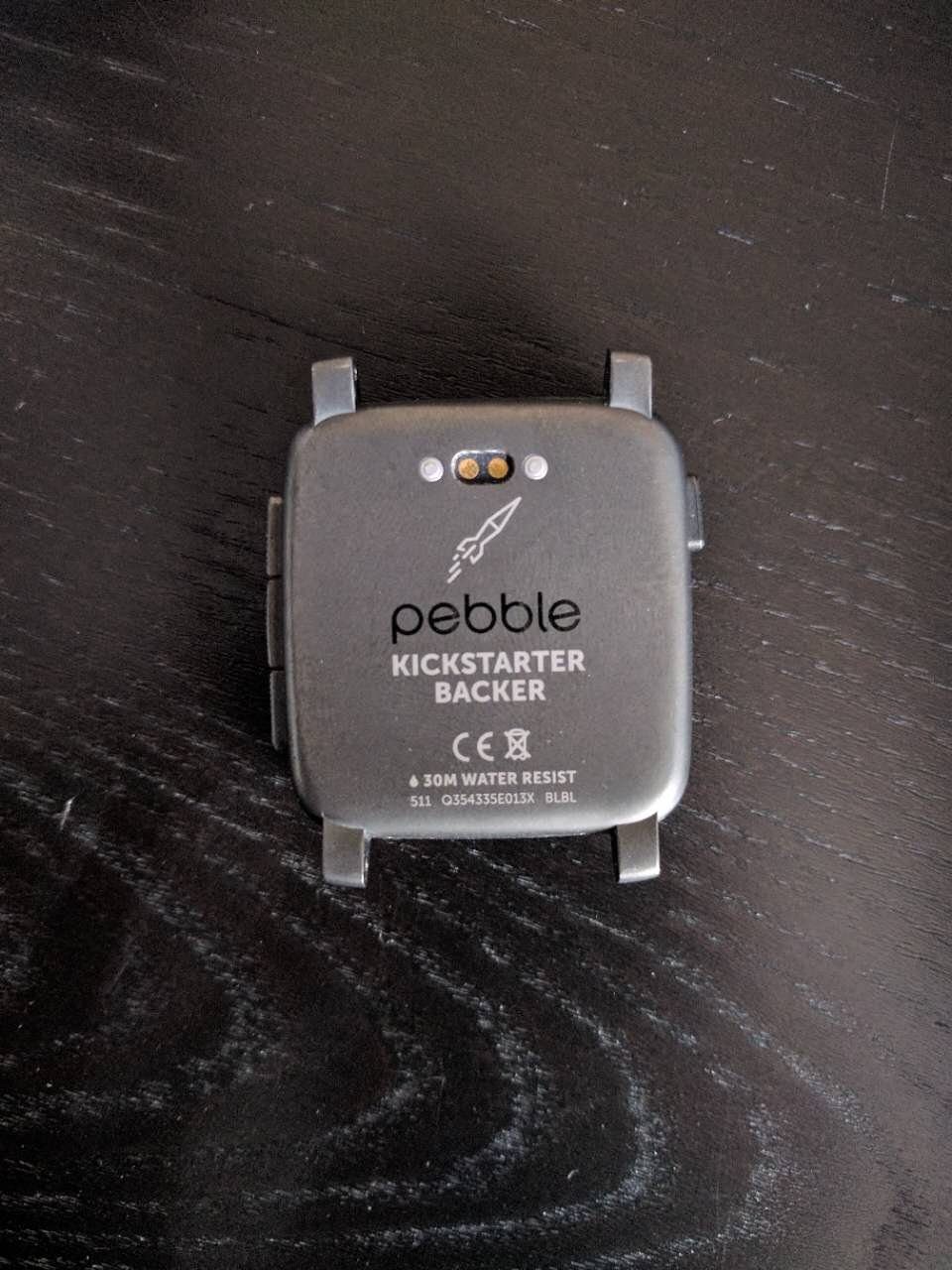
The back of a Pebble Time Steel without a band—from Pebble's second Kickstarter

The Pebble Time Steel is a variant of the Pebble Time, with a steel and leather style and 10-day battery life, while retaining full waterproofing and all of the Pebble Time's features. It has a Marine Grade steel chassis encasing it, with bezel and a PVD matte polishing finish, a 2.5D color e-paper display, and depending on color finish, comes with either a 22 mm Italian leather band with stainless steel PVD-coated buckles and "Quick Release" pins, or a 22 mm stainless steel band with PVD coating and detailing sold separately.

=== Time Round ===
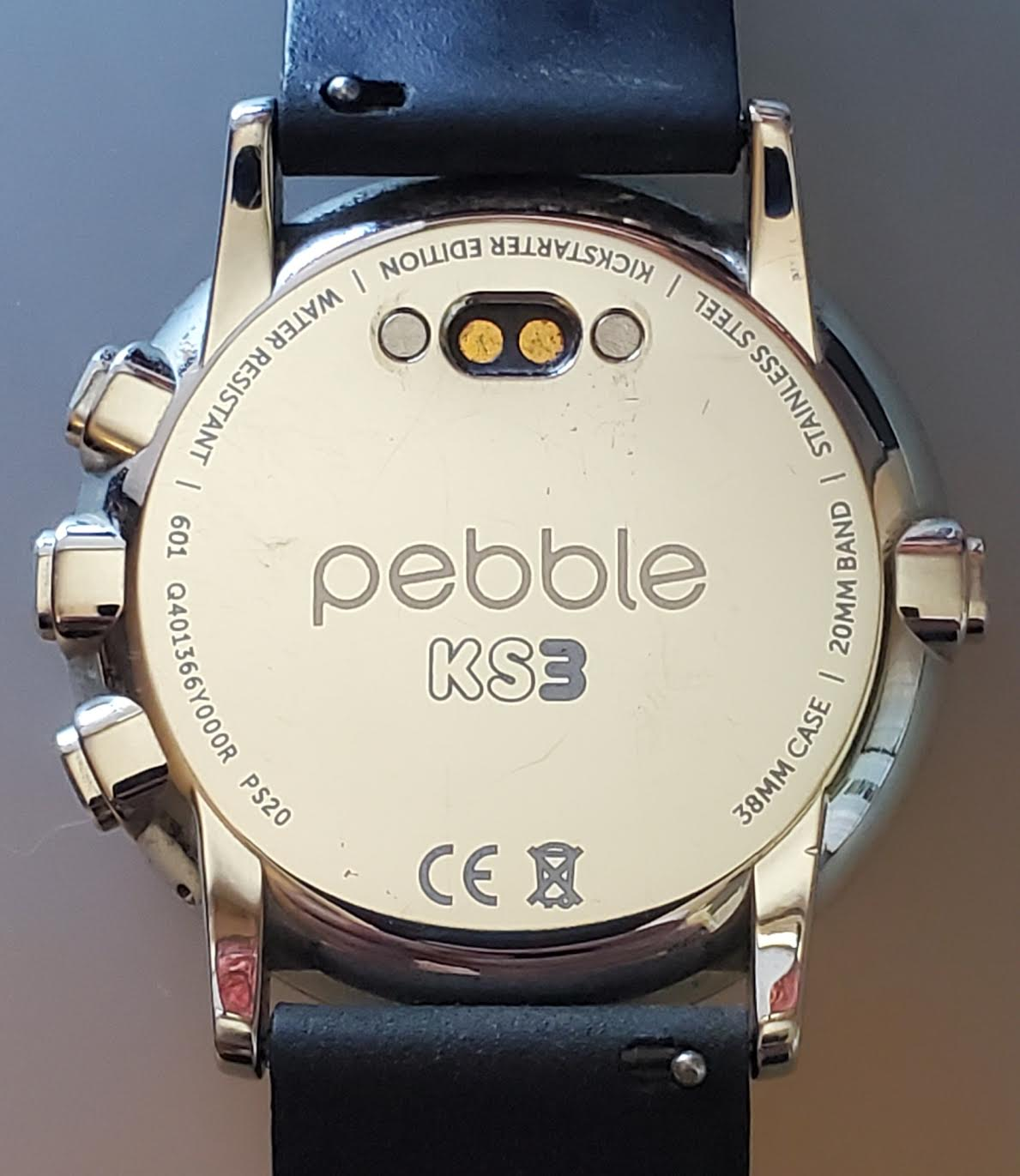
The back of a Pebble Time Round—from Pebble's third Kickstarter

The Pebble Time Round is a variant of the Pebble Time. It was available for pre-order on September 23, 2015. The watch includes a 2-day battery with 15 minutes of charging giving the watch one day of battery life. The watch has the same 64 color e-paper display as the other Pebble Times. It was available with two watch strap sizes: 14 mm and 20 mm with different color combinations for each size. The Pebble Time Round has all the same features as the Pebble Time, including the microphone for dictating text message replies, but featured a thinner, round style.

=== Time 2 ===
The Pebble Time 2 was the planned second version of the Pebble Time. It was announced via Kickstarter on May 24, 2016. The Time 2 would have featured a larger 228x200 1.5 inch color display, an optical heart rate monitor and improvements to Pebble Health. The Time 2 would have included all the same features of previous Time models.

The Pebble Time 2 was never publicly released due to the insolvency of Pebble.

=== Time 2 (Core Devices) ===
On March 18, 2025, a new Pebble Time-style watch was announced by Core Devices, following the open-sourcing of PebbleOS. On July 25, 2025, it was announced that the device would be officially named Pebble Time 2 (sometimes stylized as 'Pebble Time 2*') after Core Devices acquired the Pebble trademark. The 2025 Time 2 has an identical display to the planned 2016 Time 2. It shares most of its features with the original, but also adds more features such as a touch screen, speaker, and a claimed 30-day battery life. The smartstrap feature was removed, due to low usage of the feature in previous models. The 2025 Time 2 features a new body design that was based on an unreleased prototype Pebble watch from before the company closed. The Time 2 was made available for pre-order in a limited quantity for $225.

== Reception ==
=== Pebble Time ===
Critics praised the battery life, Android support, and color screen, but derided its Apple support, its "retro-techie" design, and its overall quality.

The Verge gave the watch a 6.8 on its score, summing up by saying that while it is fun at some points, "the Pebble Time doesn't do enough to change that." CNET also gave it 3.5 out of 5 stars for the editor's rating, and a 7.8 overall, saying that "[the] Pebble Time adds a few key improvements and a color screen..., but owners of previous Pebble[s] may not see a need to upgrade yet." Digital Trends gave it 2.5 out of 5 stars, praising the battery life, screen, design, and water resistance, but derided its software support, design, settings, interface, and price, saying that "Pebble has been left behind." Tom's Guide gave it 3.5 out of 5 stars, concluding that while it isn't the perfect smartwatch, "it's the most practical wrist companion for Android" Wired gave it a 6/10, and summed up its use by saying that they want the idea, "[but not] the watch." PC Magazine gave it a 4 out of 5, stating it "excellent" and as an "Editor's Choice", saying that "[it's a] solid choice for first-time smartwatch buyers."

=== Pebble Time Steel ===
CNET gave it 3.5 out of 5 stars for the editor's rating, but a point higher compared to Pebble Time for its overall rating, stating that "[it's better] as a more budget-friendly watch." Tom's Guide gave it 3.5 out of 5 stars, saying that it's "the company's most luxurious smartwatch to date, but it's a better choice for Android users."

== See also ==
- Apple Watch
- MetaWatch
- Microsoft Band
- Moto 360
- Wearable computer
