= Beeper (software) =

Instant messaging app

- Other names: NovaChat; Beeper Cloud; Texts
- Original authors: Eric Migicovsky; Brad Murray; Tulir Asokan; Kishan Bagaria
- Developers: Nova Technology, Inc.; Beeper, Inc.; Texts.com; Automattic
- Release: 2020; 6 years ago
- Operating system: Android; iOS; Linux; macOS; Windows
- Standard: Matrix
- Website: beeper.com
- Repository: github.com/beeper

Beeper is an instant messaging client that enables using a variety of chat services and protocols all from the same application, now developed by Automattic.

== Features ==
Beeper supports a variety of chat services and protocols, including Discord, Facebook Messenger, Instagram, IRC (via Libera Chat), Matrix, Signal, Slack, SMS/RCS (via Google Messages), X, Telegram, Google Voice and WhatsApp. The app used to support iMessage, but this has since been removed due to unreliable performance caused by iMessage's operator, Apple. Beeper is built on top of the Matrix protocol and Element application, bridged to the other services.

== History ==
=== Beeper ===
Previous Beeper logo

The app Beeper was created in 2020 by Eric Migicovsky, Brad Murray and Tulir Asokan as NovaChat. The company is located in Palo Alto, California. Migicovsky was previously the founder of smartwatch company Pebble. The company renamed the app from Beeper to Beeper Cloud upon launching Beeper Mini in December 2023. It was renamed back to Beeper in 2024.

In April 2024, Automattic acquired Beeper for $125M.

=== Texts ===
Previous Texts logo

The app Texts, which offered similar functions to Beeper, was created in 2020 by Kishan Bagaria. In 2023, Automattic acquired Texts for $50M.

=== Merge ===
After acquiring both applications, Automattic planned for Texts and Beeper to merge under the Beeper brand. In 2025, the two services combined into one.

== Beeper Mini ==
Beeper Mini was a version of the application focused on supporting iMessage on Android.

In 2023, James Gill – a 16-year-old Saucon Valley High School student at the time – reverse engineered Apple's iMessage instant messaging protocol after inspecting the network traffic generated by Apple Music on Windows and by iMessage on macOS. Gill published a proof of concept called Pypush that reimplemented iMessage in the Python programming language and released it on GitHub. After Gill contacted Migicovsky via Discord in August 2023, Migicovsky hired Gill to apply the implementation in Beeper Mini.

On December 5, 2023, the company released Beeper Mini, an Android app that can send messages through Apple's iMessage instant messaging service. The app was marketed as a way for Android users to communicate with iOS users through chat bubbles that are blue, the color used by Messages – the built-in text messaging app on iPhones – to show texts sent through iMessage. Apple keeps iMessage exclusive to Apple devices and at the time only allowed Messages to communicate with Android users through the lesser-featured SMS protocol with texts that are displayed in green chat bubbles, which are disfavored among some iPhone users who perceive them as an indicator of lower social status. Beeper Mini uses a reverse-engineered implementation of the iMessage communication protocol that supports some of iMessage's features, including blue chat bubbles and end-to-end encryption.

Beeper Mini was downloaded more than 100,000 times within two days of launch. After the release, Apple repeatedly blocked Beeper Mini from sending messages through iMessage, and Beeper updated the app multiple times to circumvent Apple's blocks. On December 21, 2023, Beeper issued its last update to Beeper Mini, which requires users to access an iOS or macOS device to enable the app to send messages through iMessage.

At the urging of congresspersons Amy Klobuchar, Mike Lee, Jerry Nadler, and Ken Buck, the United States Department of Justice initiated an antitrust investigation on December 22, 2023 to examine Apple's blocking of Beeper Mini.

Beeper Mini was discontinued in 2024.

== See also ==
- Symphony Communication
- Pidgin (software)
