= Omate TrueSmart =

Cancelled 2013 Chinese-made smartwatch

Omate
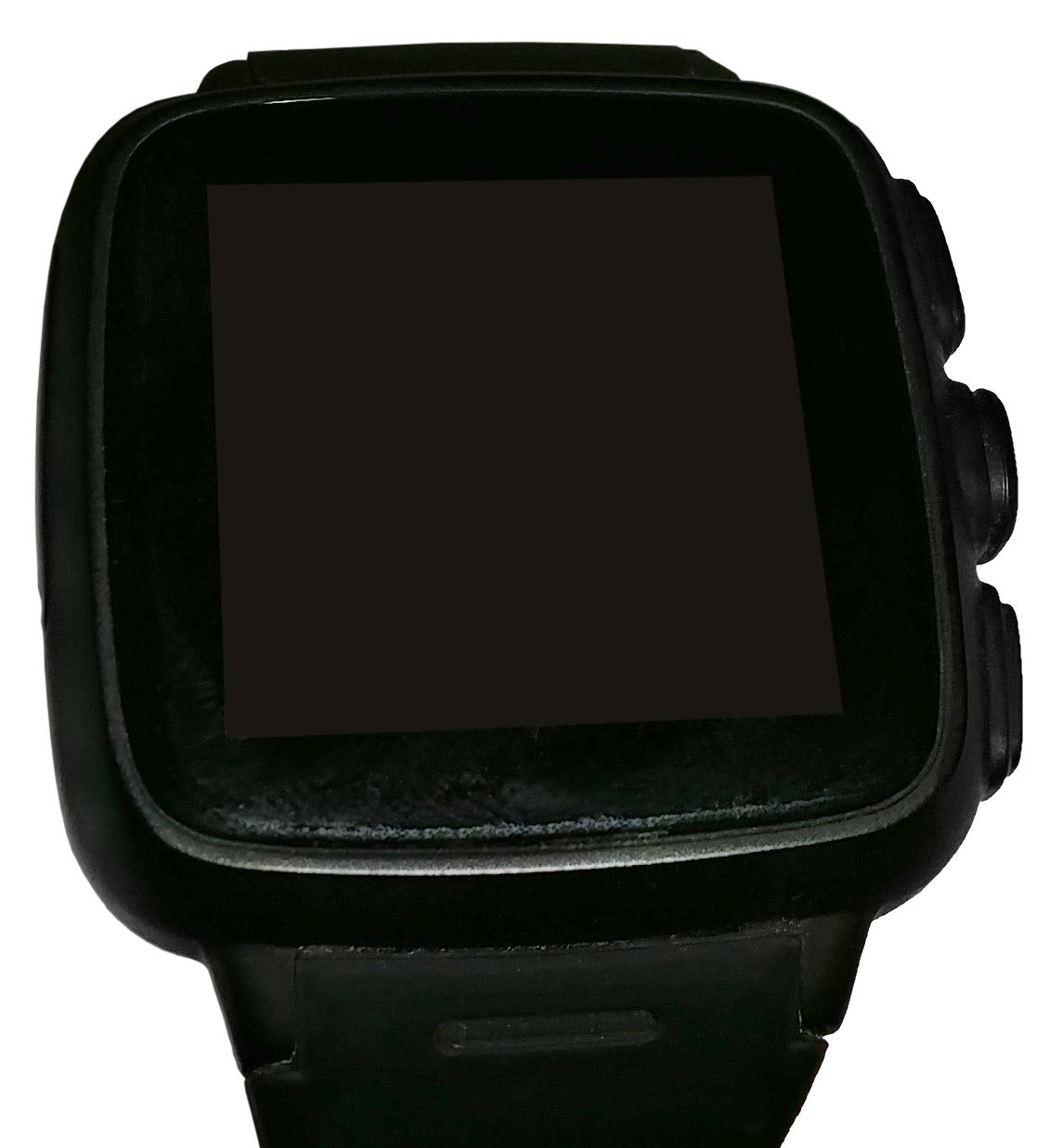
- Manufacturer: Omate
- Type: Smartwatch
- Released: August 21, 2013 (start of Kickstarter project)
- Introductory price: Kickstarter backers: USD 179–199; Retail: USD 299
- Operating system: Android 4.2.2 with Omate User Interface 2.1
- CPU: Dual-core ARM Cortex-A7 1.0-1.3 GHz Mediatek MT6572
- Memory: 512 MB or 1024 MB (Extreme Edition)
- Storage: 4 GB or 8 GB (Extreme Edition), expandable through microSD
- Display: 240 × 240 pixel 1.54" TFT by LG display covered with sapphire crystal glass
- Sound: Audio speaker
- Input: 2 hardware buttons Multi-touch capacitive touch screen microphone
- Camera: Embedded 3 megapixel camera (5 megapixel according to kickstarter specs)
- Connectivity: Bluetooth 4.0; 2G Quad Band: 900/1800/ 850/1900 GSM, GPRS, EDGE; 3G Mono band: 2 versions 2100 (Europe) or 1900 (US); UMTS, HSDPA, HSUPA, HSPA, HSPA+ WiFi: IEEE 802.11b/g/n proprietary waterproof USB connector for charging and connection to computers
- Power: 3 days standby time / At least one day of intense usage
- Dimensions: 45 mm × 45 mm × 14 mm
- Weight: ~100g
- Related: Smart watches
- Website: www.omate.com

The Omate TrueSmart is a smartwatch designed by Omate, a Chinese company based in Hong Kong and Shenzhen. It has been funded by crowd funding via Kickstarter. The funding period was from August 21, 2013 until September 20, 2013. The funding goal of $100,000 was reached within 12 hours, with more than $1,032,000 raised by the end of the campaign. In contrast to other smartwatches, the Omate is a complete standalone telecom mobile device that can be used to make calls, navigate and use Android apps independent of the user's smartphone.

== Specifications ==
The TrueSmart is powered by an ARMv7 MediaTek MT6572 chipset running Android 4.2.2 and a ROM also known as OUI - Omate User Interface.

The body of 45 mm × 45 mm × 14 mm has two side buttons for Power and Home functions. It also features a 3 megapixel camera module which is upscaled by software from 3 megapixel to 5 megapixel. In contrast to other smart watches, the TrueSmart is a standalone smartwatch that can support 3G GSM micro SIM card. The TrueSmart is a full featured Android smartphone in a watch form factor promoted as a smartwatch 2.0 (Telecom Wearable) by Omate to differentiate the device with other traditional smart watches which are mainly companion devices. Its sensors include a magnetometer, a three-axis accelerometer and a GPS. It has a vibrator, a microphone and an audio speaker. The watch is charged and connected to computers using a standard USB cable and an external charging cradle accessory.

=== Processor ===
It is powered by a dual-core ARM Cortex-A7 MediaTek MTK6572 processor running at 1 GHz (1.3 GHz according to kickstarter specs). The GPU is a Mali 400.

=== Software ===
It runs Android 4.2.2 with the customized Omate User Interface (OUI 2.1). The TrueSmart ecosystem includes basic Android applications: Settings / Phone / Email / Messaging / Contact / File Manager / Camera / Gallery and several third parties apps which are available in Omate own application store called the Ostore.

The Ostore features several categories System firmware updates are provided over-the-air.

=== Display ===
It has an LG 1.54-inch 240 × 240 pixel color IPS TFT display and a multi point touch panel covered with sapphire glass coating.

=== Battery ===
The battery is a removable 600 mAH li-ion battery, providing for 240 minutes talk time in standalone mode and 100 hours of standby time. Removing or replacing the battery will void the device's warranty. OK stickers are placed on the back plate screws.

=== Memory/storage ===
It has either 512 MB or 1 GB depending on the model of memory and 4 GB or 8 GB of storage, expandable with up to 128 GB microSD cards.

=== Build ===
The Omate TrueSmart is IP67 certified and dustproof. However water damages are not covered by the warranty as long as the device can be opened to insert a SIM card, an SD card or to replace the battery. The case is steel alloy or aluminum based, the glass is protected by a sapphire crystal coating, the straps are silicone. The straps are not replaceable since the GSM and GPS antennas are integrated into them. Measurements are 45 mm × 45 mm × 14 mm.

=== Connectivity ===
The TrueSmart is an Android-based GSM standalone smartwatch which features a micro-SIM slot. There are two versions, for different regional 3G networks: a 2100 MHz (Europe) and a 1900 MHz (US), both supporting UMTS, HSDPA, HSUPA, HSPA, and HSPA+. The 2G modem in both versions supports quad band: 900/1800/ 850/1900 GSM, GPRS, and EDGE. It has Bluetooth 3.0 (4.0 when OS is upgraded to 4.3 or newer) and Wi-Fi 802.11b/g/n connectivity.

== Kickstarter campaign ==
Omate launched a Kickstarter campaign on August 21, 2013, with an initial fundraising target of $100,000. Backers spending $199 would receive an Omate TrueSmart when they became available ($179 for the first 500 backers and $189 for the next 500 backers). The project had met the $100,000 goal in half a day. Just before the end of the campaign, over $1 million was reached.

== Project Challenges ==
- The camera was stated to be 5 megapixels, but turned out to be a 3 megapixel camera with software upscaling the pictures to 5 megapixels.
- The processor was stated to run at 1.3 GHz, but on watches with 1 GB RAM and 8 GB storage, the processor only runs at 1 GHz. Omate later explained that at full speed the heat was not bearable and therefore they reduced the clock speed
- It was promoted as an IP67 waterproof watch, which included a video of a guy swimming with it. It was later stated that swimming was not covered under warranty. The watch also isn't certified waterproof by any standard. Omate performed a test themselves, by putting a test model in a bucket of water, but didn't use a functioning model and didn't conform to IP67 standards. Even though the warranty is void if the watch is opened, it is the official recommendation to open it and pull the battery if the firmware update fails.
- The delivery was later than promised due to the massive success of the Kickstarter campaign however Omate upgraded all the backers of the 512 MB+4 GB and 1 GB+4 GB / 1900 MHz version to 1 GB+8 GB to apologize for the delays. In mid June 2014 the last batch of Kickstarter watches was shipped.
- The TrueSmart runs in rootuser mode without any checks in place like SU and SuperUser. Legitimate apps that request root access are denied due to the lack of proper steps being taken to root but secure the TrueSmart. This means that malicious apps that try to gain access without requesting permission have full root access to everything on the TrueSmart without the user ever knowing. This includes usernames and passwords, pictures, emails and so on. It is technically feasible to have an app upload all that data to a hacker without the user ever knowing it was happening and then delete itself and almost everything on the TrueSmart. This same type of hack and data theft can also be done in the background by visiting malicious websites.
- Because of issues delaying production and shipping, Omate decided to upgrade the backers who have pledged the 512 MB+4 GB (1900 MHz) to 1 GB+8 GB (1900 MHz). They offered a TrueSmart PCB keychain to those who paid for a 1 GB+8 GB version, which most users didn't receive
- The watch has a MicroSD slot for storage expansion, but opening it to use the memory card slot voids the warranty. Even the versions ordered with a memory card are shipped with the memory card not preinstalled, forcing users to open their device and thus void the warranty by breaking seal stickers.
- The companion app allowing users to get notifications from their smartphone on their TrueSmart was not shipped with the TrueSmart as planned. Later Omate certified SWApp Link developed by Cyril Preiss as the official companion app however the app does provide the promised iOs compatibility.
- Parts of the source code are not made public as they should be under the GPLv2 license. This is an issue with most MediaTek devices. Not only is this ignoring the license but it is crippling the community development that Omate envisioned.
- Several backers had difficulties getting their watch through customs. Some backers had to pay large sums of money to get the device out of customs in some countries
- The charger cable was changed to a charging cradle that has a more robust connection, but doesn't allow pressing the buttons while charging, such as to snooze or disable an alarm.
- It was possible to pledge for (order) extra accessories, such as charging cables and batteries, but several supporters didn't get their accessories. Even some accessories that are part of the basic package weren't always shipped, such as the second battery that was an (achieved) stretch goal.
- Google certification issue (see below)

=== Google Certification Issue ===
During the Kickstarter campaign, Omate claimed the TrueSmart will run Google Play, with the heading of the first Kickstarter update being "Yes, Google Play Apps Store!". However, an article on Phandroid revealed the watch cannot ship with official Google Services support due to it not meeting the Android Compatibility Definition Document requirements.

However, Omate did not update their campaign to state the lack of Google certification before the campaign ended. It was not until 22 October 2013, a month after the Kickstarter campaign ended, that Omate acknowledged that the TrueSmart will not be able to pass the Google Certification after receiving official feedback from Google

Therefore, the TrueSmart shipped without the Google Apps and Omate did not support any side loading but instead created its own Application Store called the Ostore featuring less than 50 apps in multiple categories, but including third party application stores such as Aptoide and 1mobilemarket.

== See also ==
- Wearable computer
- MetaWatch
