= MetaWatch =

Smartwatch brand

MetaWatch Strata MetaWatch Frame
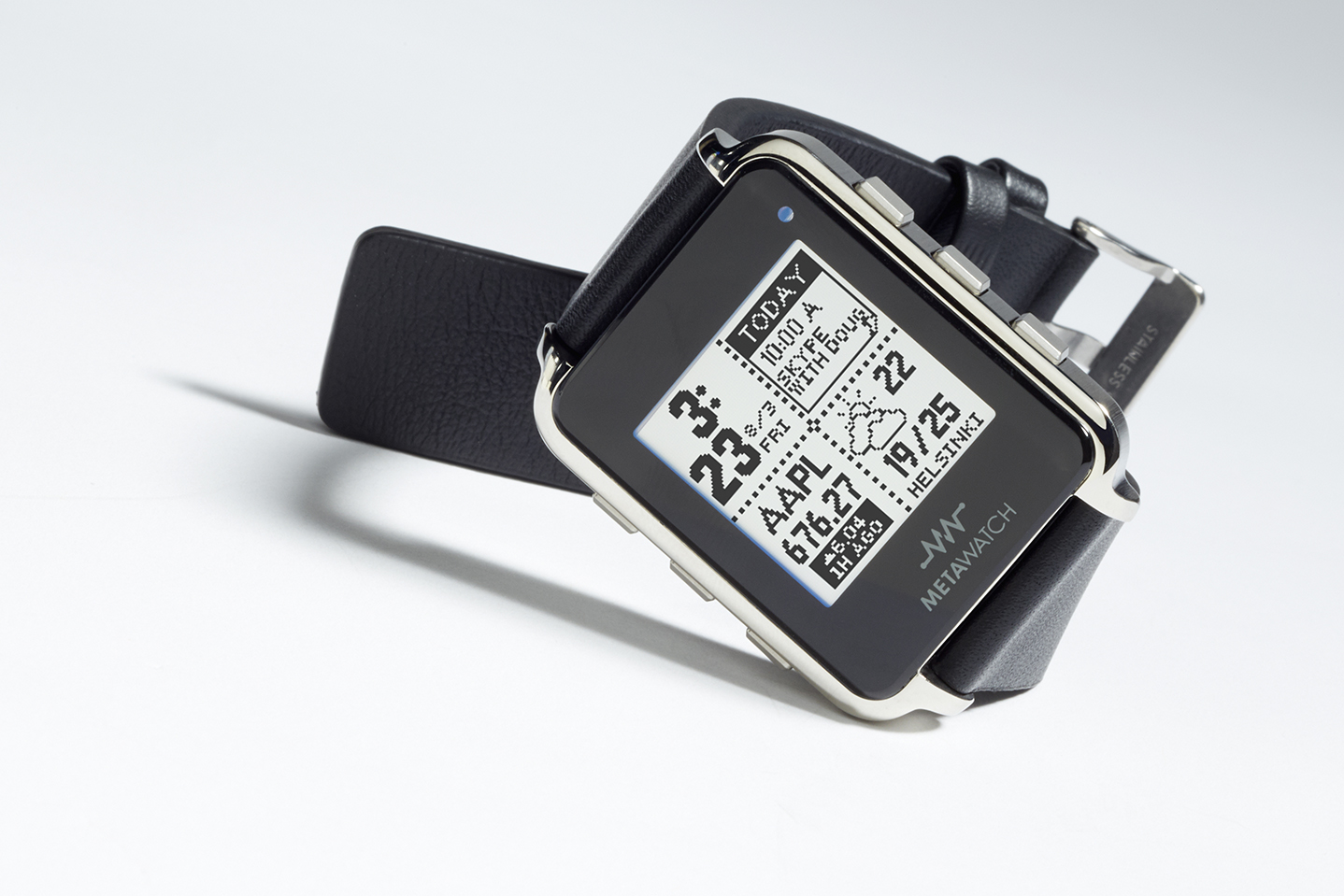
- Manufacturer: Meta Watch Ltd.
- Type: smartwatch
- Released: Strata model November 2012
- Introductory price: $159.00 for Strata, $199.00 for Frame
- Operating system: FreeRTOS V6.0.5
- CPU: TI MSP430 16-Bit Ultra-Low-Power Microcontroller
- Memory: 8 kB or 16 kB serial RAM
- Storage: 256 KB Flash
- Display: Digital watch: 1.35 in (34 mm) 96x96 pixel reflective mirror LCD; Analog watch: two 16x80 OLED displays covered with scratch-resistant, mineral hardened glass
- Input: 6 buttons 3-axis MEMS accelerometer Ambient light sensor
- Connectivity: Bluetooth 4.0
- Power: 3.7V 75mAH or 120mAh Li-ion coin cell
- Dimensions: Strata 1.74 by 1.74 by 0.5 inches (44 mm × 44 mm × 13 mm) Frame 2 by 1.5 by 0.5 inches (51 mm × 38 mm × 13 mm)
- Weight: Strata: 59 grams (2.1 oz) Frame: 81 grams (2.9 oz)
- Website: www.metawatch.org (no longer active)

The MetaWatch is a brand name of discontinued smartwatches developed by Meta Watch, Ltd. Strata MetaWatch and Frame MetaWatch are digital smartwatches released in 2012, funded by raising money via the crowd funding platform Kickstarter. MetaWatch was a company founded by former Fossil engineers.

== History ==
The first generation of MetaWatch watches was released as a development system in September 2011. Two models were sold - analog with OLED displays (model WDS111, style AU1000) and fully digital (model WDS112, style AU2000). Both were provided with a clip for charging, flashing, and debugging. For wireless connection, Bluetooth 2.1 is used via a TI CC2560 module. As a serial RAM Microchip 23A640 serial is used.

Unofficial first and half generation was extended of Bluetooth 4.0 capability. Style numbers for these watches were AU2001 and AU2004.

The second generation of MetaWatch had Bluetooth 4.0, a KXTI9 accelerometer instead of KXTF9 (using less active power), and larger battery. The 4 pins on the back of the case were multiplexed and could be either used with Spy-Bi-Wire (serialized version of JTAG) or serial out/ground. External serial RAM was larger. The clip provided with watches was for charging and reflash only. A JTAG clip for development could be bought separately.

The company has since ceased operations.

== Models ==
Second generation watches were sold under names Strata (model code SW12-1) and Frame (model code SW12-2). Strata has Water Resistant Mark 5 and Frame has Water Resistant Mark 3. The Strata, which was focused more on value, was bulkier but more durable with its double injection-moulded polyurethane body. It was also cheaper as the Kare model retailed for $140. The Frame, on the other hand, was the variant targeted towards the fashion segment. The device featured a slimmer stainless steel build, smaller display, leather bands and a price tag of $199. The Strata model was initially offered as an iOS-only device due to challenges in developing a version for the Android platform. An Android-compatible version was later released.

In 2014, Metawatch announced Meta M1, a premium smartwatch developed in collaboration with Frank Nuovo. The designer was known for his iconic works at Vertu and Nokia, where he served as a Vice President and Chief of Design. The device was launched at the 2014 Consumer Electronics Show.

== See also ==
- Wearable computer
- Pebble
- Apple Watch
- Fitbit
- Omate TrueSmart
