= Eric Migicovsky =

Canadian engineer and entrepreneur

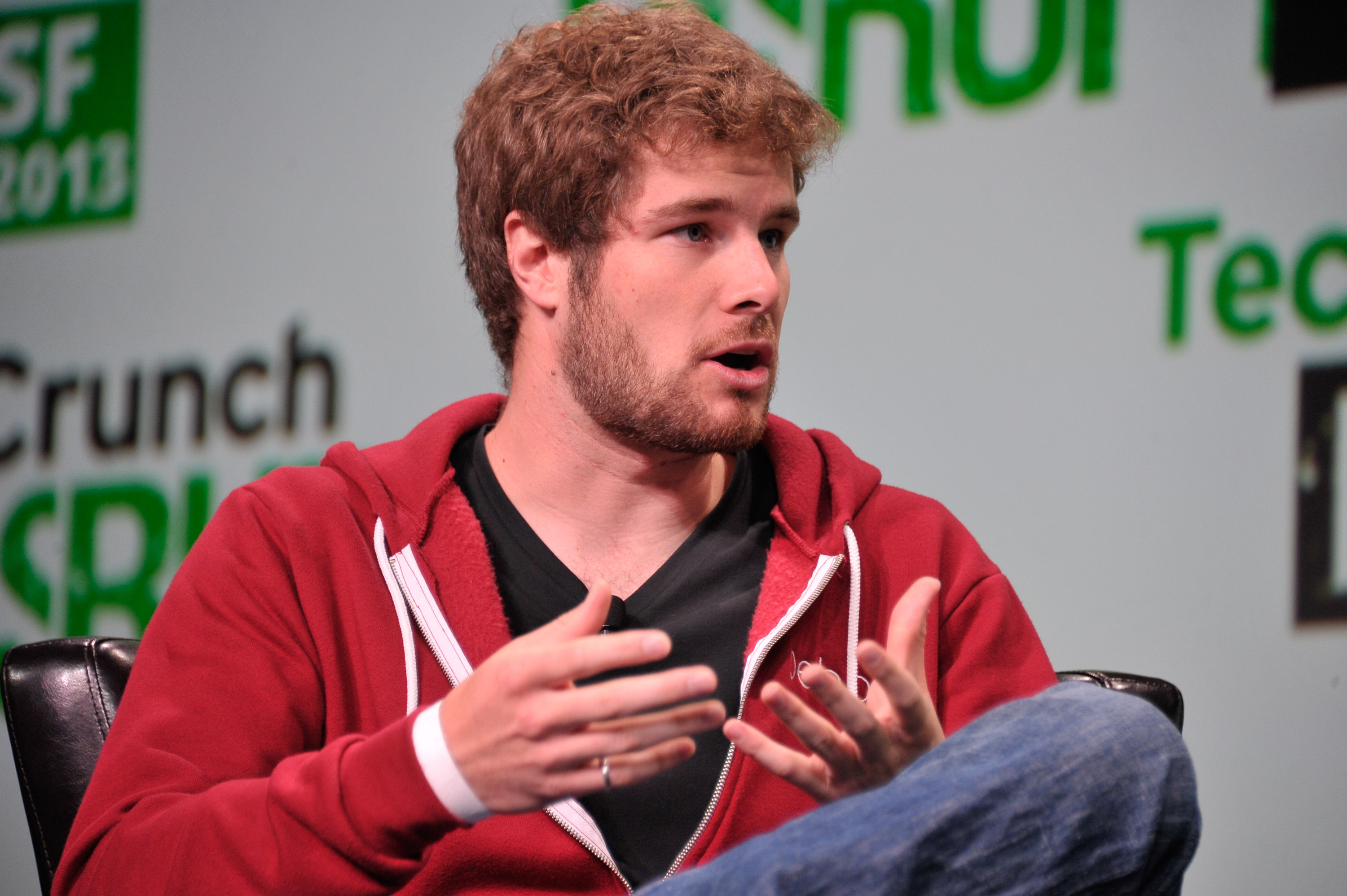
- Migicovsky in 2013
- Born: 1986 (age 39–40); Vancouver, Canada
- Education: University of Waterloo (BS)
- Known for: Pebble, Beeper
- Website: ericmigi.com

Eric Migicovsky (born 1986) is a Canadian engineer and entrepreneur. He is the founder of the smartwatch company Pebble Technology and its successor Core Devices, as well as the co-founder of the instant messaging software company Beeper.

== Career ==
Migicovsky was born in 1986 in Vancouver, Canada. He earned a Bachelor's degree in Systems Design Engineering from the University of Waterloo in 2009. In 2008, as part of his studies, he spent time as an exchange student at the Delft University of Technology in the Netherlands. While in Delft, where bicycles are a common mode of transport, Migicovsky sought a safer way to access information without handling his smartphone while cycling. This led to the development of InPulse, a smartwatch initially compatible only with BlackBerry devices, which launched in 2010. Following this, Migicovsky founded the smartwatch company Pebble Technology, which launched their first model in January 2013. In 2016, the company filed for insolvency and was subsequently acquired by rival Fitbit. He later co-founded the instant messaging software company Beeper, which was sold to Automattic in April 2024. In 2025, following a request by Migicovsky, Google, which had acquired Fitbit and thereby obtained the rights to Pebble, open-sourced PebbleOS, the operating system powering the Pebble watch. Subsequently, Migicovsky founded a new company and launched the Core Devices line of watches, regarded as the successor to Pebble.

== Personal life ==
Migicovsky lives with his family in Palo Alto, California. Colette Berends was his great aunt.
