= Pebble (watch) =

Smartwatch

Pebble Smartwatch

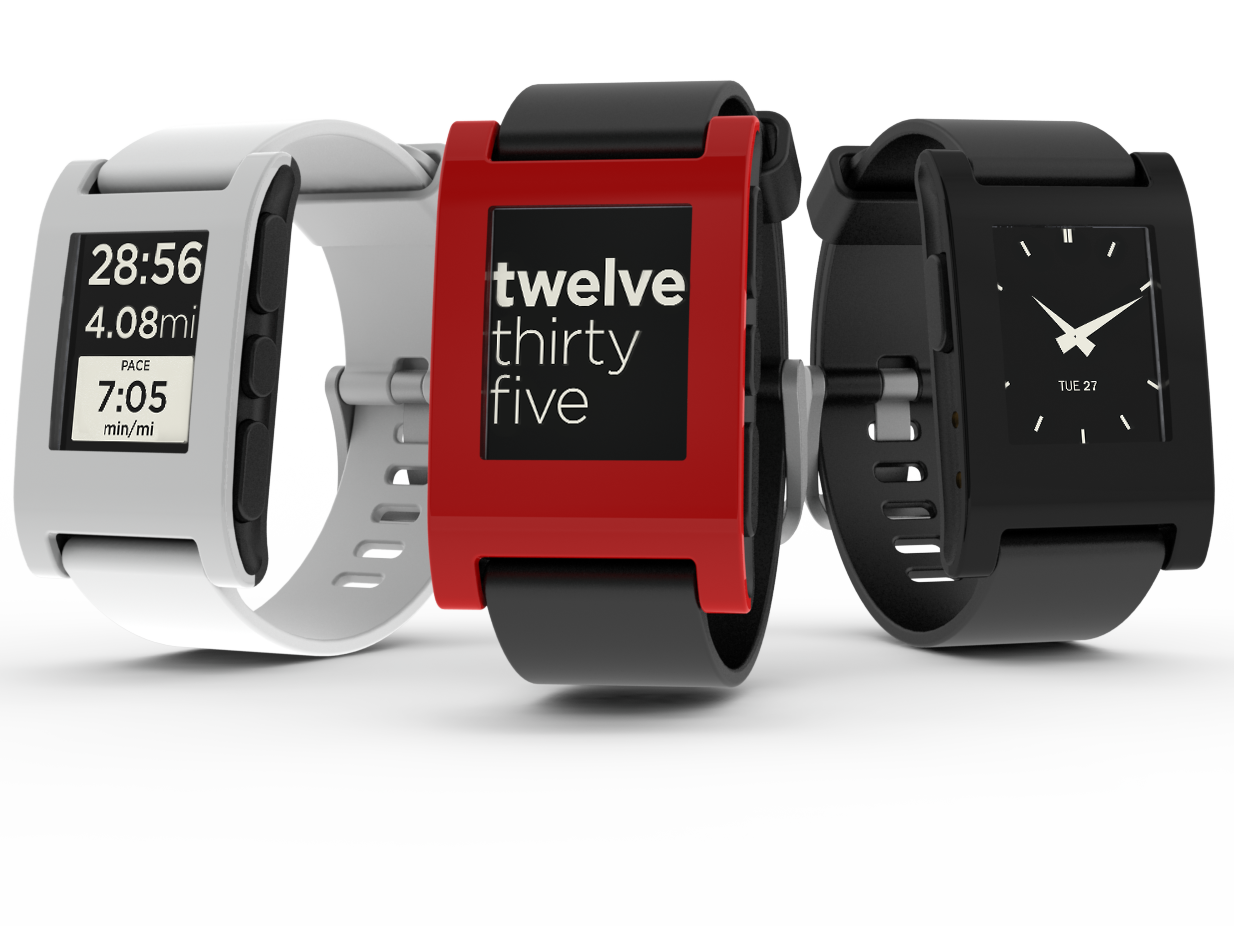
- Also known as: Pebble
- Developer: Pebble Technology, Corp., Pebble Devices, Corp in California.
- Manufacturer: Foxlink Group in Taiwan
- Product family: Pebble
- Type: Smartwatch
- Generation: 1
- Released: January 23, 2013
- Introductory price: Pebble: $99; Pebble Steel: $149
- Discontinued: December 7, 2016
- Units sold: 2,000,000+ as of December 2017
- Operating system: Pebble OS; uses a customized FreeRTOS kernel. Can communicate with Android and iOS apps using Bluetooth. Portions of Pebble OS are closed source.
- CPU: STM32F205RE Cortex M3 CPU
- Memory: RAM 128 KB (84 KB OS, 24 KB app, 12 KB background worker, 8 KB app services)
- Storage: Pebble Time series: 50 slots for faces/apps stored on watch, infinite can be loaded from the connected phone. Pebble Classic series: 8 slots for apps/watch faces, 100 KB per slot for a total of 800 KB user accessible space. The Kickstarter version has 4 MiB (32 Mibit) flash. Originals built after October 2013 and all Steel watches have 8 MiB (64 Mibit) flash. All models also have 512 KiB SoC flash memory
- Display: 32-millimetre (1.26 in) 144×168 pixel Sharp Memory transflective LCD
- Graphics: Pebble Classic/Steel: 1-bit black-and-white transflective LCD; Pebble Time: 64 (6-bit) color e-paper.
- Sound: None
- Input: 4 buttons 3-axis accelerometer with gesture detection magnetometer and ambient light sensor, microphone on Pebble Time models
- Camera: None
- Connectivity: Bluetooth 2.1 and 4.0 LE (used for iOS 7 notifications) + EDR
- Power: 130 mAh, 7 days (assuming c. 20–30 notifications a day, and a per-minute updating watchface)
- Current firmware: Version 4.3
- Dimensions: Pebble: 52 mm × 36 mm × 11.5 mm (2.05 in × 1.42 in × 0.45 in), Pebble Steel: 46 mm × 34 mm × 10.5 mm (1.81 in × 1.34 in × 0.41 in)
- Weight: Pebble: 38 g (1.34 oz), Pebble Steel: 56 g (1.97 oz) (with default watchband attached)
- Successor: Core Devices
- Related: Fitbit
- Website: repebble.com

Pebble is a series of smartwatches sold by Pebble Technology Corporation of Palo Alto, California from 2013 until 2016, and by Core Devices since 2025. Created by Eric Migicovsky, Pebble was initially funded through a Kickstarter campaign in 2012, and was the most funded project in Kickstarter's history at the time. Pebble smartwatches are notable for their e-paper displays, which display the time using stylized digital watch faces, and display messages and notifications from connected Android and iOS devices. They are also capable of running downloadable apps, which are used for a wide variety of functions.

The original Pebble watch featured a black-and-white screen and a plastic body; it was followed in 2014 by the Pebble Steel, a stainless steel-bodied version with a glass screen. After a second Kickstarter campaign, Pebble launched its second-generation watches, the Pebble Time series with color screens, in 2015.

Pebble filed for insolvency in December 2016, discontinued production of all of its products, and sold a majority of its assets to Fitbit. Support for the watches' online services ceased in June 2018, although some were restored by the unofficial "Rebble" community. After Google, which acquired Fitbit in 2021, released the source code to Pebble's software, Migicovsky founded Core Devices in 2025, and subsequently revived the Pebble brand with new devices.

== History ==
=== Development ===
The original Pebble Smartwatch was designed based on a concept by Eric Migicovsky describing a watch that could display messages from a smartphone and select Android devices. Migicovsky successfully took his idea through the Y Combinator business incubator program, and unusually for a startup company at Y Combinator, Migicovsky's business actually generated revenue during the program. Migicovsky was able to raise US$375,000 from angel investors such as Tim Draper of Draper Fisher Jurvetson, but was unable to raise additional funds. Discussing his inability to raise further funds, Migicovsky told the Los Angeles Times, "I wasn't extremely surprised... hardware is much harder to raise money for. We were hoping we could convince some people to our vision, but it didn't work out."

=== Funding ===
After raising venture capital for the product under their former name, Allerta (which had already developed and sold the inPulse smartwatch for BlackBerry devices), the company failed to attract traditional investors under their new Pebble brand name, so the company pursued crowd funding in April 2012.

Migicovsky's company, Pebble Technology, launched a Kickstarter campaign on April 11, 2012, with an initial fundraising target of $100,000. Backers spending $115 would receive a Pebble when they became available ($99 for the first 200), effectively pre-ordering the $150 Pebble at a discounted price. Within two hours of going live, the project had met its $100,000 goal, and within six days, the project had become the most funded project in the history of Kickstarter to that point, raising over $4.7 million with 30 days left in the campaign.

On May 10, 2012, Pebble Technology announced they were limiting the number of pre-orders. On May 18, 2012, funding closed with $10,266,845 pledged by 68,929 people. At the time, the product held the world record for the most money raised for a Kickstarter project.

=== Original production (2013–2016) ===
Pebble worked with consulting firm Dragon Innovation to identify suppliers and manufacturers. After overcoming manufacturing difficulties with the prototype design, Pebble started mass production with Foxlink Group in January 2013, initially producing 15,000 watches per week. Shipping was originally expected to begin in September 2012, but manufacturing difficulties were encountered. The first units began shipping on January 23, 2013.

Pebble shipped 300,000 units by December 2013, over 400,000 by March 2014, 450,000 as of July 2014, 1 million by December 31, 2014, and 2 million by December 7, 2017.

Pebble reportedly declined a $740 million offer from Citizen Watch to buy the company in 2015, and a subsequent offer from Intel to purchase it for $70 million in 2016.

In March 2016, Pebble relocated its headquarters from Palo Alto to nearby Redwood City, California, and laid off 40 of its 160 employees.

=== Closure of Pebble Technology; initial discontinuation ===
According to Wired, Migicovsky determined in October 2016 that Pebble was unlikely to become profitable, and began to seek a buyer for the company. By December 1, Fitbit was reportedly in advanced talks to acquire Pebble.

Pebble Technology filed for insolvency with the state of California on December 6, 2016, and sold its software, intellectual property, and some other assets to Fitbit that day. The purchase price was initially not disclosed, but was reported to be between $34-40 million; later, in February 2017, Fitbit was reported to have paid $23 million. The acquisition did not include Pebble's hardware, product inventory, or server equipment, which was to be sold off separately; nor did it include Pebble's debt liabilities, which reportedly exceeded the purchase price.

Fitbit retained some personnel from Pebble; it offered new positions to 40% of Pebble's staff, primarily software engineers, and those hired were relocated to Fitbit's offices in San Francisco. By the end of December 2016, 82 Pebble employees had been laid off, though some were given severance packages. Per Wired, Migicovsky prioritized the retention of Pebble's employees and users, which was a primary factor in his decision to sell the company to Fitbit.

Further clarification on the transition timeline and efforts to render Pebble OS and its watchfaces/apps more self-sufficient was posted to the Pebble Dev Blog on December 14, 2016.

As a result of the closure, Pebble was forced to cancel remaining shipments of the Pebble 2 smartwatch, and to entirely cancel production of the planned Pebble Time 2 and Pebble Core devices. Kickstarter backers whose shipments were canceled received refunds.

The selling of Pebble brand to Fitbit was credited to Charles River Ventures who invested $15 million in the company in 2013.

Fitbit pledged to support Pebble's online services through the end of 2017, and later extended their operation through June 2018. The company offered existing Pebble owners a $50 discount on the purchase of a new Fitbit Ionic smartwatch.

=== Rebble ===
Shortly after the announcement of Pebble Technology's shutdown, a group of Pebble owners and enthusiasts created the unofficial developer group Rebble to continue support for Pebble watches' online services. After Fitbit closed Pebble's original servers on June 30, 2018, Rebble launched the Rebble Web Services platform; it replaced most of Pebble's online services, including the app store, firmware updates, and other technical support functions. Most of these services were available free of charge, but to support their operations, Rebble charged a US$3 monthly subscription fee to use the watches' weather and dictation features.

Fitbit was subsequently acquired by Google in January 2021.

=== Revival under Core Devices ===
Google open-sourced most of the codebase of the PebbleOS software in January 2025. That month, Migicovsky announced the development of new smartwatches using PebbleOS, and subsequently founded Core Devices to produce the watches. On March 18, Core Devices unveiled two new products slated to launch later that year - the Core 2 Duo and Core Time 2 - and opened pre-orders for both models. Core Devices recovered the Pebble trademark in July 2025, and renamed the models Pebble 2 Duo and Pebble Time 2, (Note: Per Migicovsky, the company considered naming the device the Pebble Time 2*, with an asterisk, to avoid confusion with the previous canceled watch of the same name.) respectively.

In November 2025, a dispute between the Rebble organizers and Core Devices started, regarding ownership of the archive of Pebble apps, conditions of operation of the app store and general cooperation rules. In December 2025, Migicovsky released the source code for the new Pebble mobile app.

In January 2026, Migicovsky announced a third new watch, the Pebble Round 2, based on the previous Pebble Time Round; pre-orders opened at $199, with an estimated shipping date of May 2026.

The Pebble 2 Duo (said to be short for "do-over") is based on the previous Pebble 2, and features a plastic body with a 1.2-inch monochromatic display; it sold for $149. The Pebble Time 2, based on a concept model of the same name canceled by Pebble's closure, sells for $225, and features a stainless steel body with a 1.5-inch color display, and a heart rate sensor. Unlike the original Pebble series, all announced Core Devices watches feature touchscreens, and a claimed battery life of at least two weeks; they all also feature step tracking and IPX8 water resistance.

== Features ==
=== Hardware ===
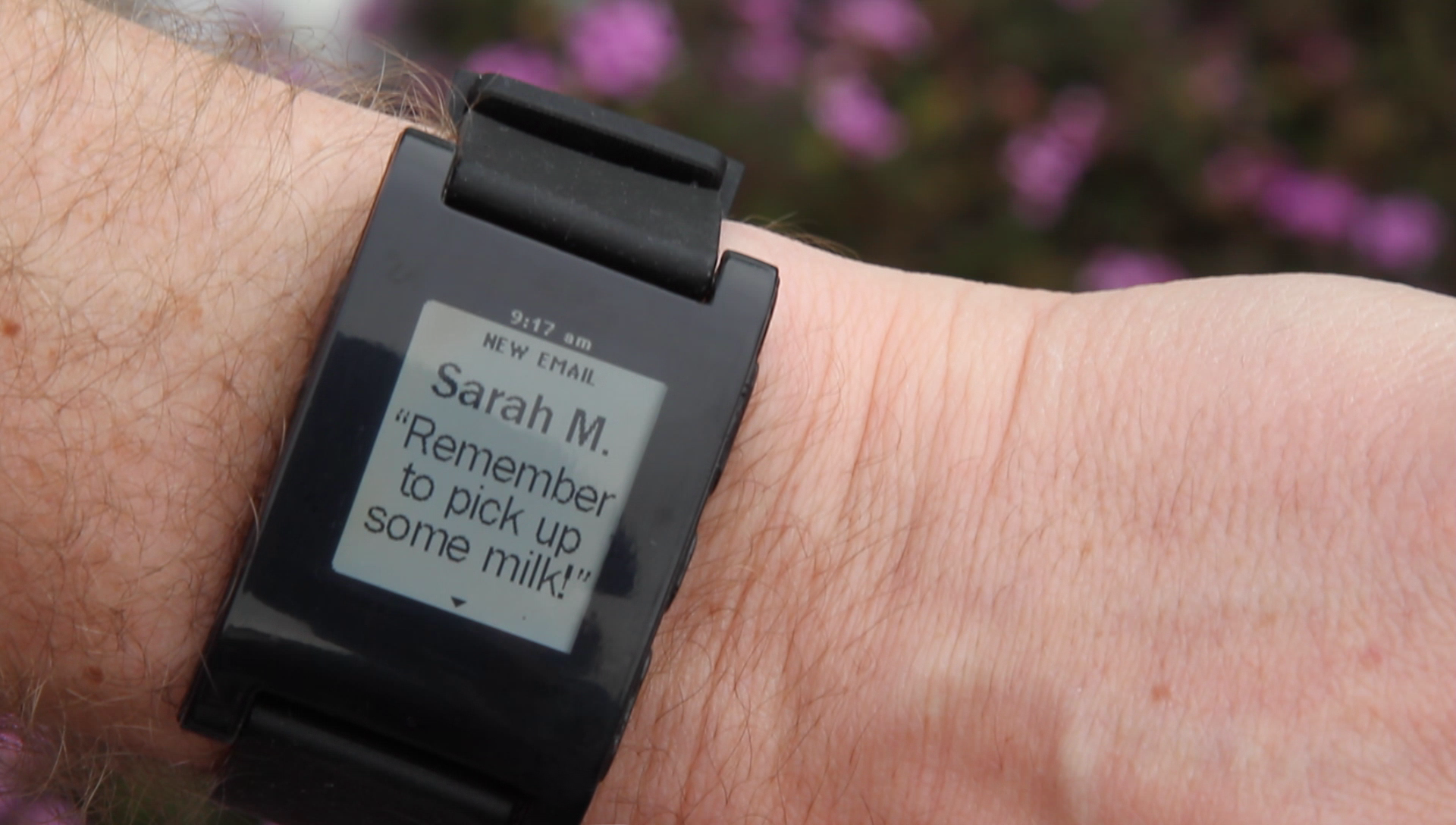
Pebble can display notifications when, for example, one receives an email

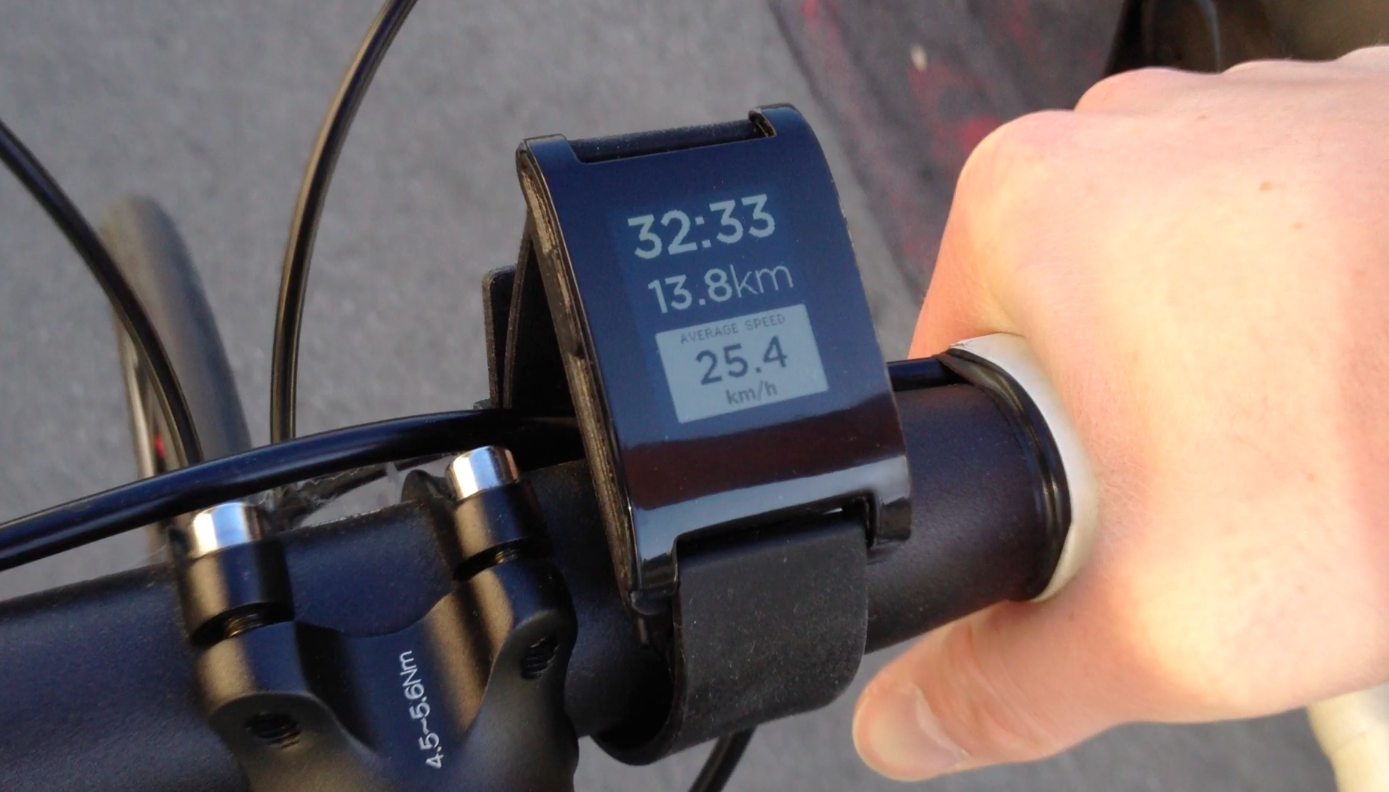
A Pebble attached to a bike, displaying cycling speed, distance, and time

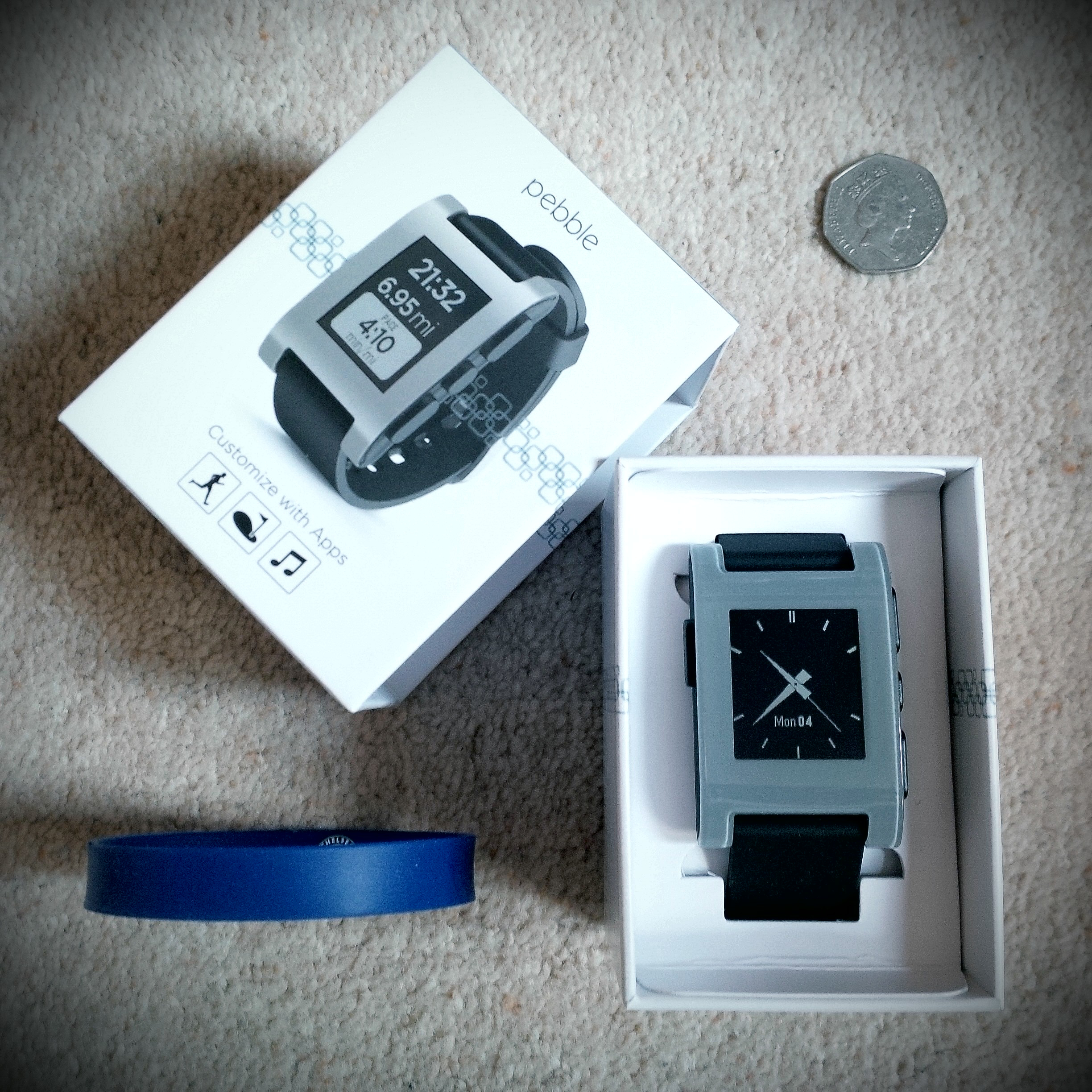
Pebble smartwatch size compared to UK's 50p coin and standard silicone wristband

The watch featured a 32-millimetre (1.26 in) 144 × 168 pixel black and white memory LCD using an ultra low-power "transflective LCD" manufactured by Sharp; it contained a backlight, vibration motor, magnetometer, ambient light sensors, and three-axis accelerometer. It can communicate with an Android device using both Bluetooth 2.1 and Bluetooth 4.0 (Bluetooth Low Energy) through Stonestreet One's Bluetopia+MFi software stack. Bluetooth 4.0 low energy (LE) was not initially supported, but was later added through a firmware update in November 2013. The watch is charged through a modified USB-cable that attaches magnetically to the watch to maintain water resistance capability, with a reported seven-day battery life. Water-resistance was added during development based on feedback from Kickstarter backers. The Pebble has a waterproof rating of 5 atm, which means it can be submerged down to 40 metres (130 ft), and was tested in both fresh and salt water, allowing the user to shower, dive or swim while wearing the watch.

=== Software ===
As of February 2014, the Pebble app store contained over 1,000 applications. Applications included notification support for emails, calls, text messages and social media activity; stock prices; activity tracking (movement, sleep, estimates of calories burned); remote controls for smartphones, cameras and home appliances; turn-by-turn directions (using the GPS receiver in a smartphone or tablet); display of RSS or JSON feeds; and hundreds of custom watch faces.

The Pebble was announced to ship with several apps pre-installed, including a cycling app to measure speed, distance, and pace through GPS, and a golf rangefinder app supporting more than 25,000 courses. Not all announced apps were ready when the watch started shipping. Migicovsky announced on January 9, 2013, that updates for the watch's operating system would be released every 2–3 weeks until all features were added.

The Pebble's apps used data received from a connected phone for distance, speed, and range information. More apps were downloadable via a mobile phone or tablet, and a software development kit (SDK) was freely available.

Pebble integrates with Android and iOS phones through a companion app to send notifications to the watch. Messaging and phone call apps were supported, in addition to most 3rd party applications.

The watch's firmware operating system is based on the FreeRTOS kernel and uses Newlib, the STM32 Peripheral Library, the Ragel state machine compiler, and an unnamed UTF-8 Decoder.

Gadgetbridge is an alternative companion application for Android. It is open source, does not require account creation, and supports features such as notifications, music playback and watch application installation/removal.

Linux users can interface with the Pebble using libpebble. This enabled experimental services on several Linux distros including Maemo, the OS used on the Nokia N900. There was also a commercial app called Rockwatch for MeeGo, the OS used by the Nokia N9, that provided services including managing the Pebble's firmware and apps running on the watch.

==== Pebble SDK ====
Pebble Technology announced that an open Pebble software development kit (SDK) would be released before shipment of the watches began. A proof-of-concept watchface SDK and documentation were released on April 12, 2013. Eventually, Pebble SDK version 1.0 was released and was limited to development for watch faces, simple applications, and games. SDK version 2.0 (later renamed PebbleKit) was released on May 17, 2013, and added support for two-way communication between Pebbles and smartphones running iOS or Android via the AppMessage framework.

As of February 2015, the PebbleKit SDK included APIs to access Bluetooth messaging, background workers, the accelerometer, the compass, and supported C and JavaScript (with some limitations) for developing apps. Applications written using the second PebbleKit SDK were not backwards compatible with 1.x apps, and developers were required to port their apps to the second-gen firmware.

== Reception ==
The original Pebble Smartwatch was released to mixed reviews. The design was acclaimed for being innovative. CNET praised the design, readability, and water-resistance of the Pebble Steel, but criticized the limit of eight user-installed apps and the lack of a heart-rate monitor. Later watches in the Pebble series were described similarly: as simple and effective but lacking some features of competitors like the Apple Watch. Some concerns were also expressed by iFixit about build quality and reliability, while also commending the watch's repairability.

== Later generations ==
=== Pebble Time ===
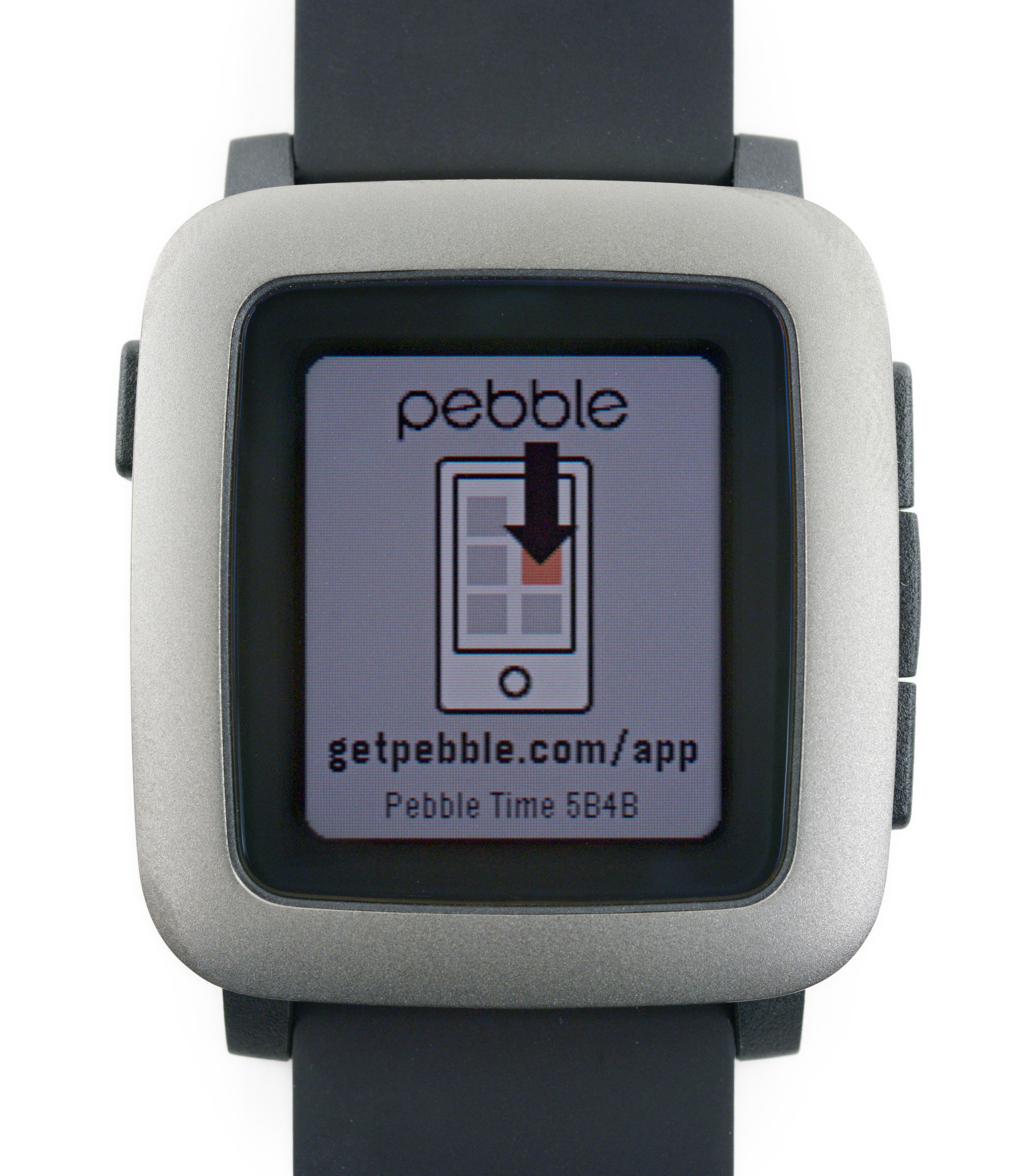
Pebble Time

On February 24, 2015, Pebble announced the Pebble Time, their second-generation Pebble smartwatch via its Kickstarter campaign.

The Pebble Time Steel is a stainless steel variant of the Pebble Time smartwatch, available in multiple finishes: silver, black or gold with either a leather or steel band. Pebble claims it has a 10-day battery life.

The Pebble Time Round is also made of stainless steel and 2.5d Gorilla Glass with five finishes. Pebble claims it has a 2-day battery life, dramatically decreased because of the shape and size but still significantly longer-lasting than the Apple Watch's 16-hour life.

==== Hardware ====
Pebble's second generation comes with various improvements over its predecessors, such as a 64-colour e-paper display with Gorilla Glass a thinner and more ergonomic chassis, plastic casing and a microphone. The Pebble Time retains the seven-day battery life and water resistance found on the previous two Pebble watches. It has a 150mAh battery.

Alongside the Pebble Time Steel, Pebble announced its open hardware platform called "Smartstraps". This lets developers develop new third-party straps that connect to a special port at the back of the watch and can add new features like GPS, heart rate monitors, extended battery life and other things to the watch. This new platform prevents smartwatch bloat and making the watch bulky like most of its competitors' smartwatches.

==== Software ====
The Pebble Time also included a new interface designed around a timeline, which is similar to what was found in Google Now on Android Wear. In December 2015, all remaining Pebbles got a firmware update, enabling support for the timeline and removing the maximum of 8 apps-restriction, letting additional apps load directly from the connected phone. It is backwards compatible with all previous apps and watch faces.

Third parties have created apps for Pebble Time, such as contactless payment (tap to pay).

==== Funding and records ====
The Pebble Time retailed for $199. The project reached its Kickstarter funding goal of $500,000 in 17 minutes. The project took 49 minutes to reach $1 million, which is a Kickstarter record. The project raised $10.3 million in 48 hours, another Kickstarter record. On March 3, 2015, Pebble Time became the most funded Kickstarter ever with nearly $14 million funded, while having 24 days left in its campaign. At the end of the funding, March 27, 2015, Pebble Time received pledges of $20,338,986 from 78,471 backers.

=== Pebble 2 ===
Pebble 2, the company's 3rd generation smartwatch, launched on Kickstarter on May 24, 2016, with an offer period of 36 days at discounted introductory pricing, and shipment of the new models anticipated in the October–November 2016 timeframe. Among the new features was a heart rate monitor (On +HR models), microphone, and water resistance rated for 30 m (98 ft) depth, which was 10m less than the original Pebble because of the Pebble 2's Microphone. Many new features were documented as part of the Kickstarter prospectus, while other technical specifications of the forthcoming products are not yet disclosed.

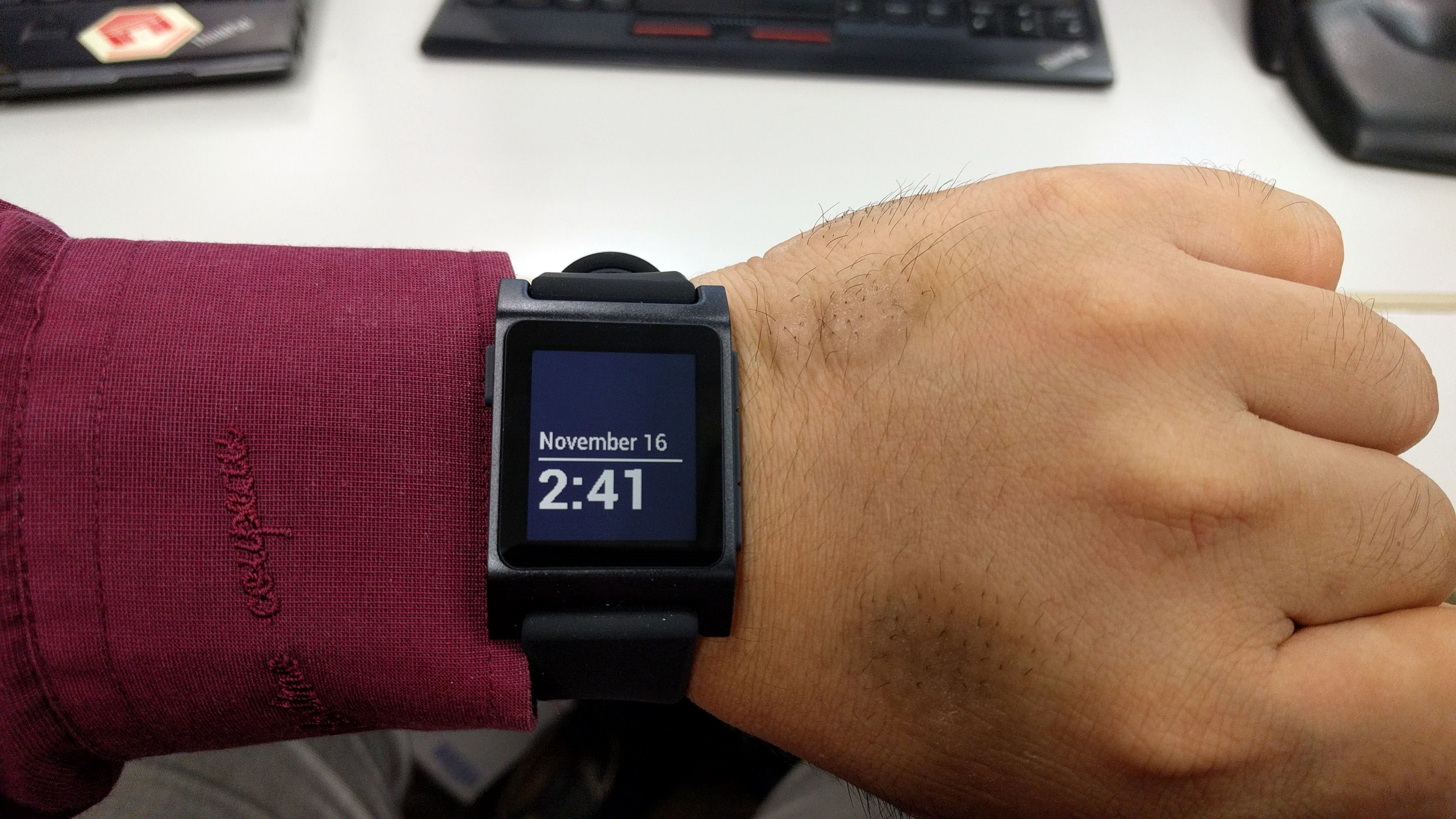
Pebble 2

The Pebble 2 product line added a new device called the Pebble Core, "a tiny wearable computer with Android 5.0" featuring a 3G modem, GPS, and Spotify integration backed by an open development community. Pebble 2 was officially released in September 2016 with a new design and functions at $129. When Pebble sold parts of its company to Fitbit in late 2016, Gizmodo criticized the company for collecting $12.8 million in the product's Kickstarter and delaying shipments for half a year without being forthright with their supporters. Kickstarter backers who have not received the product were expected to receive refunds in 2017.

== See also ==
- Wearable computer
