= List of Palm OS devices =

This is a list of Palm OS devices, and companies that make, or have made, them.

== Abacus/Fossil, Inc. ==
Fossil, made Wrist PDAs that use the Palm OS operating system.(Discontinued)

- AU5005—Palm OS 4.1
- AU5006—Palm OS 4.1
- AU5008—Palm OS 4.1
- FX2008—Palm OS 4.1
- FX2009—Palm OS 4.1

== Aceeca ==
- Meazura—Palm OS 4.1.2
- PDA32—Garnet OS 5.4

== Acer ==
- S10/S11/S12—Palm OS 4.1 - first Chinese Palm
- S50/S55—Palm OS 4.1, color Hi-Res screen
- S60/S65—Palm OS 4.1, MP3 player, voice recorder, color Hi-Res screen

== AlphaSmart ==
- Dana—Palm OS 4.1.2 - small "laptop" running Palm OS with a 560x160 pixel greyscale LCD, full-sized keyboard, two SD card slots, 8MiB or 16Mib memory, powered by NiMH or 3 x AA battery or wall adapter
- Dana Wireless—Palm OS 4.1.2, same features as Dana plus Wi-Fi, 16MiB memory, SDIO support, widescreen launcher

== Garmin ==
PDA with integrated GPS.

- iQue 3600a—Palm OS 5.4
- iQue 3600—Palm OS 5.2.1
- iQue 3200—Palm OS 5.2.1
- iQue 3000—Palm OS 5.2.1

== Group Sense PDA ==
Smartphones with Palm OS

- Xplore G18—Palm OS 4.1 (candybar, 2.2" 176x240 16-bit TFT, CIF camera, Dragonball VZ 33 MHz, 16MB RAM, 4MB OS flash)
- Xplore G88—Palm OS 4.1 (slider, 2.2" 176x240 16-bit TFT, CIF camera, Dragonball VZ 33 MHz, 16MB RAM, 4MB OS flash, 24MB user flash appearing as an internal SD card)
- Xplore M28—Palm OS 5.4 (slider, 2.2" 176x240 16-bit TFT, VGA camera, ARM9 CPU, 32MB NVFS storage, SD/MMC card slot)
- Xplore M68—Palm OS 5.4 (candybar, 2.2" 176x240 16-bit TFT, 1.3MP camera, ARM9 CPU, SD/MMC card slot)
- Xplore M70—Palm OS 5.4 (candybar, 2.2" 176x240 16-bit TFT, 1.3MP camera with video recording, ARM9 CPU, SD/MMC card slot)
- Xplore M70S—Palm OS 5.4 hardware same as M70 with security firmware update
- Xplore M98—Palm OS 5.4 (flip, 2.2" 176x240 16-bit TFT inside, 96x96 outside, 1.3MP camera, ARM9 CPU, 32MB NVFS storage, microSD card slot)

== Handera/TRG ==
- TRGpro—Palm OS 3.5.3 - introduced standard (CF) Card slot (company was at that time TRG (Technology Resource Group))
- Handera 330—Palm OS 3.5.3
- Handera 330c— never released

== Handspring ==
The inventors of the Palm formed a new company called Handspring in June 1998, operating until 2003 when it merged with Palm, Inc.'s hardware division.

=== Visor ===
Visors introduced color cases and the Springboard Expansion slot.

- Visor Solo—Palm OS 3.1H - 16 MHz, 2 MB RAM, B&W
- Visor Deluxe—Palm OS 3.1H/H2 - 20 MHz, 8MB RAM, B&W
- Visor Platinum—Palm OS 3.5.2H - 33 MHz, 8 MB RAM, B&W
- Visor Prism—Palm OS 3.5.2H3 - 33 MHz, 8 MB RAM, color (world's first 16-bit color Palm OS device)
- Visor Edge—Palm OS 3.5.2H - 33 MHz, 8 MB RAM, B&W, thin, sleek, metal case
- Visor Neo—Palm OS 3.5.2H3 - 33 MHz, 8 MB RAM, B&W
- Visor Pro—Palm OS 3.5.2H3 - 33 MHz, 16 MB RAM, B&W

=== Treo ===
Smartphones (except 90)

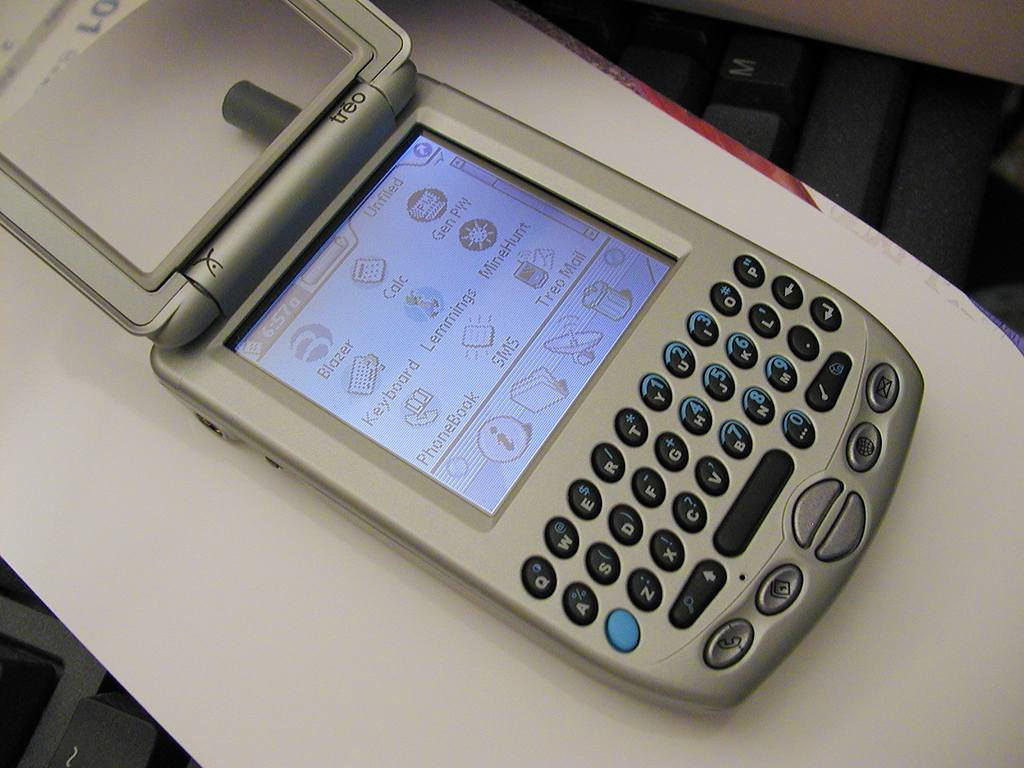
The Treo 300

- Treo 90—Palm OS 4.1H - can be updated to 4.1H3 which adds SDIO support
- Treo 180—Palm OS 3.5.2H
- Treo 180g—Palm OS 3.5.2H - the Treo 180 with Graffiti area, rather than a keyboard
- Treo 270—Palm OS 3.5.2H
- Treo 300—Palm OS 3.5.2H6.2
- Treo 600—Palm OS 5.2.1H

== IBM ==
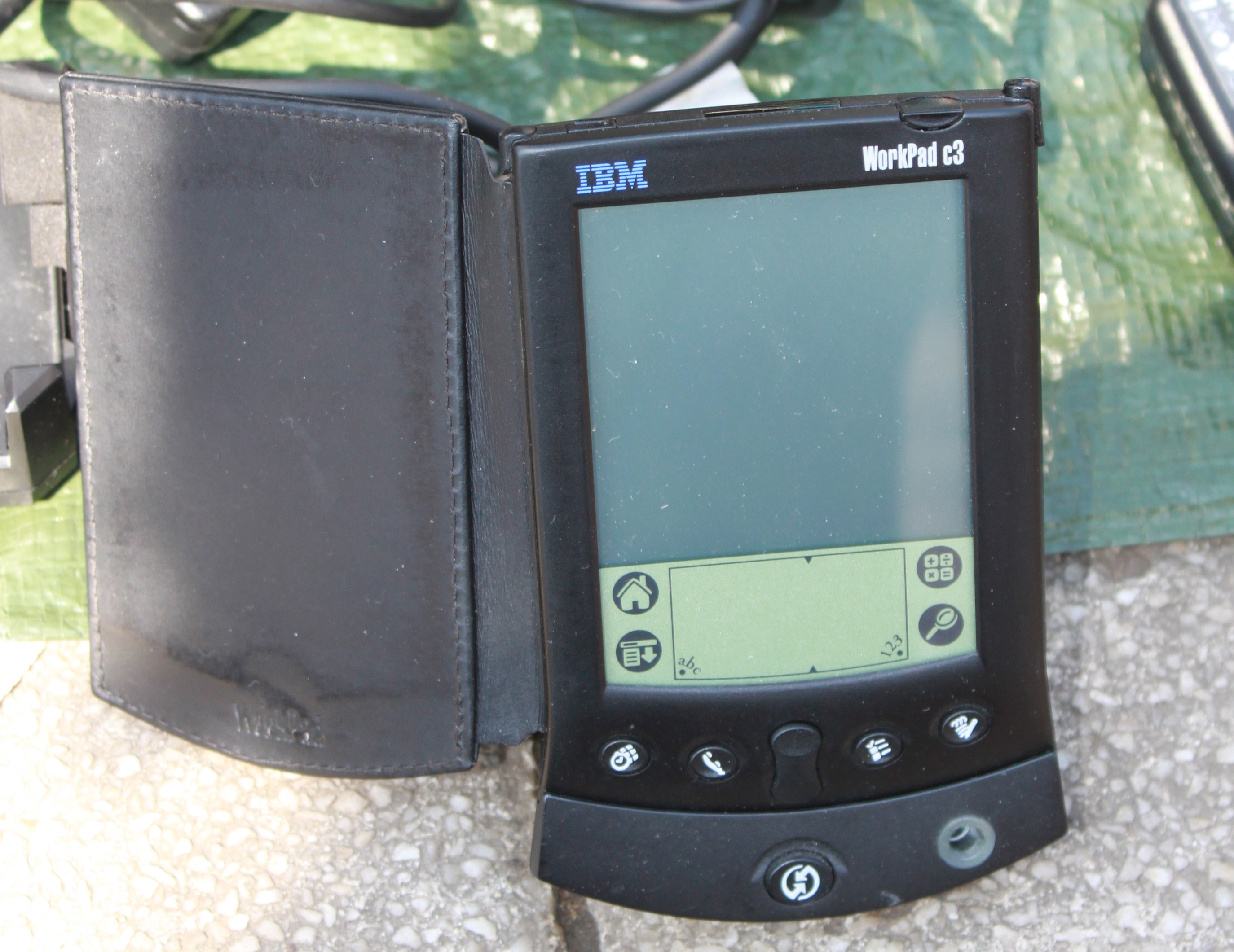
IBM WorkPad c3

IBM's Workpad series was nearly identical to PDAs manufactured by Palm. The main difference were color and logo on the casing.

=== WorkPad ===
- WorkPad (rebadged PalmPilot)
- WorkPad 20X (rebadged Palm III)
- WorkPad 30X (rebadged Palm IIIx)
- WorkPad c3 (rebadged Palm V/Vx) thin, sleek, metal case
- WorkPad c500 (rebadged Palm m500) thin, sleek, metal case
- WorkPad c505 (rebadged Palm m505) thin, sleek, metal case

== Janam ==
- XP20—Palm OS 5.4.9, B&W 160x160 screen, two variants: one with a full keyboard, one with partial
- XP30—Palm OS 5.4.9, Color 240x160 screen, two variants: one with a full keyboard, one with partial

== Kyocera ==
Smartphones

- QCP-6035—Palm OS 3.5.3
- QCP-7135—Palm OS 4.1

== Legend Group ==
- Pam 168—Palm OS 4.1

== Lenovo ==
Chinese PDAs

- p100—Palm OS 5.3
- p200—Palm OS 5.3
- p300—Palm OS 5.3

== Palm, Inc. & palmOne, Inc. ==
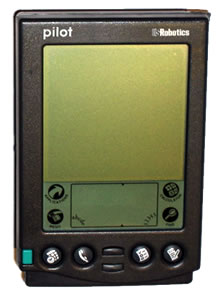
A Palm Pilot 5000

- Pilot 1000 (as division of USRobotics)—Palm OS 1.0 - 16 MHz, 128 KB RAM
- Pilot 5000 (as division of USRobotics)—Palm OS 1.0 - 16 MHz, 512 KB RAM
- PalmPilot Personal (as division of USRobotics)—Palm OS 2.0 - 16 MHz, 512 KB RAM, backlight
- PalmPilot Professional (as division of USRobotics)—Palm OS 2.0 - 16 MHz, 1 MB RAM, backlight
- Palm III—Palm OS 3.0 - 16 MHz, 2 MB RAM (update possible to 3.5.3 (website) or 4.1 (CD))
- Palm IIIx—Palm OS 3.1 - 16 MHz, 4 MB RAM (update possible to 3.5.3 (website) or 4.1 (CD))
- Palm V—Palm OS 3.1 - 16 MHz, 2 MB RAM, thin, sleek, metal case (update possible to 3.5.3 (website) or 4.1 (CD))
- Palm VII—Palm OS 3.2 - 16 MHz, 2 MB RAM, Palm.net wireless
- Palm IIIe—Palm OS 3.1 - 16 MHz, 2 MB RAM, no flash OS upgrade
- Palm Vx—Palm OS 3.3 - 20 MHz, 8MB RAM, thin, sleek, metal case (update possible to 3.5.3 (website) or 4.1 (CD))
- Palm IIIxe—Palm OS 3.5 - 16 MHz, 8 MB RAM (update possible to 3.5.3 (website) or 4.1 (CD))
- Palm IIIc—Palm OS 3.5 - 20 MHz, 8 MB RAM, Palm's first color screen (8-bit) (update possible to 3.5.3 (website) or 4.1 (CD))
- Palm VIIx—Palm OS 3.5 - 20 MHz, 8 MB RAM, Palm.net wireless
- Palm m100—Palm OS 3.5 - 16 MHz, 2 MB RAM
- Palm m105—Palm OS 3.5 - 16 MHz, 8 MB RAM
- Palm m500—Palm OS 4.0 - 33 MHz, 8 MB RAM, thin, sleek, metal case (update possible to 4.1 (website))
- Palm m505—Palm OS 4.0 - 33 MHz, 8 MB RAM, 16-bit color screen, thin, sleek, metal case (update possible to 4.1 (website))
- Palm m125—Palm OS 4.0.1 - 33 MHz, 8 MB RAM
- Palm i705—Palm OS 4.1 - 33 MHz, 8 MB RAM, Palm.net wireless
- Palm m130—Palm OS 4.1 - 33 MHz, 8 MB RAM, 12-bit color screen
- Palm m515—Palm OS 4.1 - 33 MHz, 16 MB RAM, 16-bit color screen, thin, sleek, metal case

=== Zire ===
The Zire series, renamed "Z" series in 2005, are the lower-end Palm models. Some have color screens (160x160 or 320x320), some are B&W (160x160).

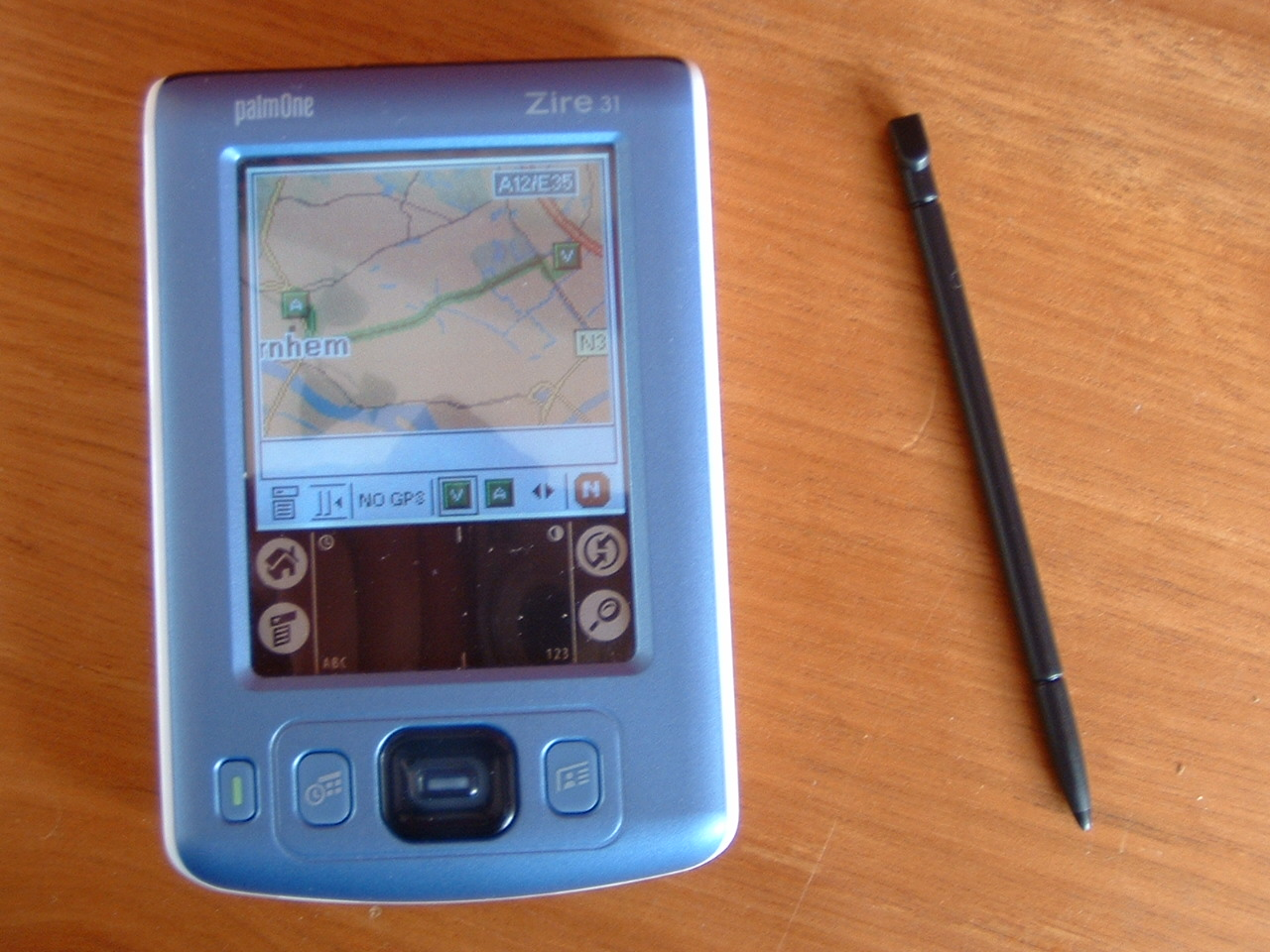
The palmOne Zire 31 and stylus

- Zire (also known as m150)—Palm OS 4.1 - 16 MHz, 2 MB RAM
- Zire 71—Palm OS 5.2.1 - 144 MHz, 16 MB RAM, 0.3MP digital camera, MP3 player
- Zire 21—Palm OS 5.2.1 - 126 MHz, 8 MB RAM, new PIM
- Zire 31—Palm OS 5.2.8 - 200 MHz, 16 MB RAM, new PIM, MP3 player
- Zire 72 & 72s—Palm OS 5.2.8 - 312 MHz, 32 MB RAM, new PIM, 1.2MP digital camera with video, voice recorder, MP3 player, Bluetooth
- Palm Z22—Palm OS 5.4.9 - 200 MHz, 32 MB RAM, new PIM, NVFS

=== Tungsten ===
The Tungsten series, renamed "T" series in 2005, are the high-end Palm models, with ARM/RISC processors (except the Tungsten W), high-resolution color screens, and SD memory cards.

- Tungsten T (also known as m550)—Palm OS 5.0 - 144 MHz, 16 MHz, sliding case, voice recorder, Bluetooth
- Tungsten W—Palm OS 4.1.1 - 33 MHz, 16 MB RAM, physical keyboard, cell service (update possible to 4.1.2 (website))
- Tungsten C—Palm OS 5.2.1 - 400 MHz, 64 MB RAM, physical keyboard, voice recorder, Wi-Fi
- Tungsten T2—Palm OS 5.2.1 - 144 MHz, 32 MB RAM, voice recorder, Bluetooth
- Tungsten E—Palm OS 5.2.1 - 126 MHz, 32 MB RAM, new PIM
- Tungsten T3—Palm OS 5.2.1 - 400 MHz, 64 MB RAM, new PIM, sliding case, voice recorder, MP3 player, Bluetooth
- Tungsten T5—Palm OS 5.4.0 - 416 MHz, 256 MB RAM, new PIM, NVFS, internal USB flash drive, MP3 player, Bluetooth (update possible to 5.4.8 (website))
- Tungsten E2—Palm OS 5.4.7 - 200 MHz, 32 MB RAM, new PIM, NVFS, Bluetooth, MP3 player
- Palm TX—Palm OS 5.4.9 - 312 MHz, 128 MB RAM, new PIM, NVFS, MP3 player, Wi-Fi, Bluetooth

=== LifeDrive ===
- LifeDrive—Palm OS 5.4.8 - 416 MHz, 64 MB RAM, 4 GB Microdrive, new PIM, NVFS, voice recorder, MP3 player, Wi-Fi, Bluetooth

=== Treo ===
The Treo series are combo cell phones/PDA models, originally developed by Handspring.

- Treo 600—Palm OS 5.2.1H (The first models were "Handspring"-branded, later models were "Palm"-branded.)
- Treo 650—Palm OS 5.4, 5.4.5 or 5.4.8 depending on specific carrier version
- Treo 680—Palm OS 5.4.9
- Treo 700p—Palm OS 5.4.9
- Treo 755p—Palm OS 5.4.9
- Palm P850—Palm OS 5.2H - released in 2010 in the Chinese market, also called the Treo P850

=== Centro ===
The Palm Centro is a combo cell phone/PDA, similar to the Treo line.

- Centro—Palm OS 5.4.9

== Qool ==
- QDA 700—Palm OS 5.4.1 - Cell Phone

Made by Pitech

== Qualcomm ==
Smartphones, later sold to Kyocera

- pdQ 1900 (single-mode CDMA 1900 MHz digital PCS)—Palm OS 3.0
- pdQ 800 (dual-mode 800 MHz digital/analog PCS)—Palm OS 3.0

== Samsung ==
Smartphones

- SPH-i300—Palm OS 3.5
- SPH-i330—Palm OS 3.5.3
- SCH-M330—Palm OS 3.5.3 - Scheduled for release in South Korea
- SPH-i500—Palm OS 4.1
- SPH-i550—Palm OS 5.2 - never released.
- SCH-M500—Palm OS 5.2 - Scheduled for release in South Korea in mid-July 2004.
- SGH-i500—Palm OS 5.2 - never released
- SGH-i505—Palm OS 5.2 - never released
- SGH-i530—Palm OS 5.2 - never sold, only given away at Athens Olympics 2004
- SCH-i539—Palm OS 5.4.1 - Released in China

== Sony CLIÉ ==
Sony developed and marketed the CLIÉ multimedia PDA from 2000 to 2005.

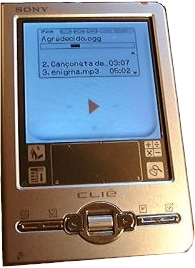
The Sony CLIÉ TJ37

=== N Series ===
- PEG-N610C—Palm OS 4.0
- PEG-N710C—Palm OS 3.5.2
- PEG-N760C—Palm OS 4.1S, MP3 player

=== NR Series ===
- PEG-NR70—Palm OS 4.1S
- PEG-NR70V—Palm OS 4.1S

=== NX Series ===
- PEG-NX60—Palm OS 5.0, MP3 player
- PEG-NX70V—Palm OS 5.0, MP3 player, VGA-resolution digicam/camcorder
- PEG-NX73V—Palm OS 5.0, MP3 player, VGA-resolution digicam/camcorder (/E European versions also had Bluetooth)
- PEG-NX80V—Palm OS 5.0, MP3 player, 1.3 MP digicam/camcorder

=== NZ Series ===
- PEG-NZ90—Palm OS 5.0, MP3 player, 2 MP digicam/camcorder

=== S Series ===
- PEG-S300—Palm OS 3.5S
- PEG-S320—Palm OS 4.0S
- PEG-S360—Palm OS 4.0S
- PEG-S500C—Palm OS 3.5S

=== SJ Series ===
- PEG-SJ20—Palm OS 4.1
- PEG-SJ22—Palm OS 4.1
- PEG-SJ30—Palm OS 4.1
- PEG-SJ33—Palm OS 4.1

=== SL Series ===
- PEG-SL10—Palm OS 4.1, B&W paper-white screen

=== T Series ===
Some or all of the models in the T series feature a thin, sleek metal case.

- PEG-T400—Palm OS 4.1, vibe-alarm feature, B&W HiRes screen (Japanese)
- PEG-T415—English ROM version of the PEG-T400
- PEG-T425—European version of the PEG-T415
- PEG-T600C—Palm OS 4.1, color HiRes screen (Japanese)
- PEG-T615C—English ROM version of the PEG-T600
- PEG-T625C—European version of the PEG-T615C
- PEG-T600C—Palm OS 4.1, MP3 player, color HiRes screen
- PEG-T665C—English ROM version of the PEG-T650
- PEG-T675C—European version of the PEG-T665C

=== TG Series ===
- PEG-TG50—Palm OS 5.0

=== TH Series ===
- PEG-TH55—Palm OS 5.2.1, Wi-Fi (/E European versions also had Bluetooth)

=== TJ Series ===
- PEG-TJ25—Palm OS 5.2
- PEG-TJ27—Palm OS 5.2
- PEG-TJ35—Palm OS 5.2
- PEG-TJ37—Palm OS 5.2

=== UX Series ===
- PEG-UX40—Palm OS 5.2, MP3 player
- PEG-UX50—Palm OS 5.2, MP3 player

=== VZ Series ===
- PEG-VZ90—Palm OS 5.2.1

== Symbol ==
PDA with integrated barcode reader

- SPT-1500—Palm OS 3.0.2r3
- SPT-1550—Palm OS 3.0
- SPT-1700—Palm OS 3.5
- SPT-1733—Palm OS 3.5.2
- SPT-1734—Palm OS 3.5.2
- SPT-1740—Palm OS 3.5
- SPT-1800—Palm OS 4.0
- SPT-1833—Palm OS 4.0
- SPT-1834—Palm OS 4.0
- SPT-1846—Palm OS 4.0

== Tapwave ==
A PDA designed for handheld gaming. It was held sideways (landscape), had an analog joystick and extra gaming buttons, and used Bluetooth for multiplayer gaming as well as standard PDA functions. It also introduced a dedicated video chip, and dual SD card slots.

- Tapwave Zodiac 1—Palm OS 5.2T, MP3 player
- Tapwave Zodiac 2—Palm OS 5.2T, MP3 player

== Oswin ==
Two models (candybar and slider) were demonstrated at PalmSource Euro Dev Con 2005 running Palm OS Cobalt 6.1.1 A few were sold onsite. Oswin never produced more. These were the only Palm OS Cobalt devices to be seen in the wild. The codename for the candybar version was Zircon A108.

== Emulators ==
- POSE (Palm OS Emulator)—Free Palm OS 4 emulator for PCs
- Palm OS Simulator—Palm OS 5 simulator for PCs
- StyleTap—for Windows Mobile, Symbian, and Android
- Garnet VM—for Access Linux Platform and Maemo
- Classic—for webOS-based Devices
- PHEM—for Android-based devices
- Cloudpilot—for web browsers and mobile devices

== See also ==
- List of Pocket PC Devices
