= Palm Serial =

Palm Serial Connector
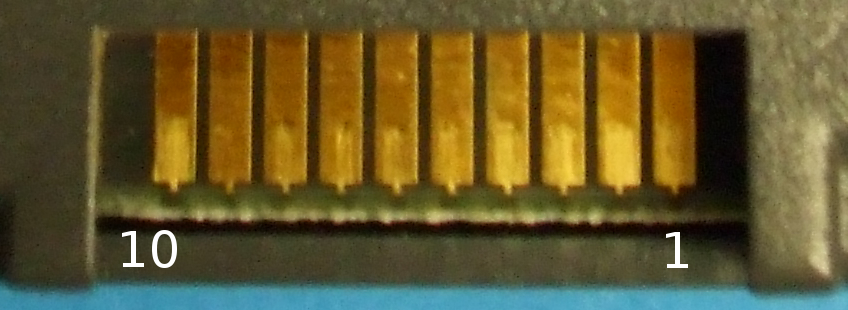
- Type: Communication, power supply

Production history
- Designer: Palm, Inc.
- Superseded by: Palm Universal Connector

General specifications
- Pins: 10

Pinout
Pin 1	DTR output nonstandard	RS-232
Pin 2	+3.3 V	VCC
Pin 3	RS-232 input, Signal T RxD	RxD
Pin 4	RTS RS-232 output	RTS
Pin 5	RS-232 output, Signal R TxD	TxD
Pin 6	CTS RS-232 input	CTS
Pin 7	HotSync IRQ - +3.3 V to press the HotSync button	HOTSYNC
Pin 8	Peripheral id. The Palm modem connects this pin to pin 2 to 20 kOhms ID	ID
Pin 9	is not connected. In the Palm III, 5 V DC output	N/C
Pin 10	Signal Ground	GND

The Palm Serial were 3 successive proprietary 10-pin Serial connectors on the bottom of the first 3 series of models of PDAs from Palm, Inc. to provide serial communications: 1) pre-IrDA models; 2) the 1st IrDA models; 3) the 1st thin, metal-body models. In addition to Palm's models (and rebranded models like the IBM WorkPad series) similar serial connectors have been used in the Ericsson MC16 Palmtop and Handera equipment. Pressing the HotSync button located at the base of the cradle closes a circuit between pins 2 and 7 which causes the activation of MUN2214 NPN transistor connected to pin 38 of the Motorola Dragonball CPU that provides a low signal on the IRQ1 UART, triggering the HotSync process. On pin 8 when a modem connects to the Palm similarly closes a circuit pin 2 to activate another MUN2214 NPN transistor connected to pin 32 (GPIO UART) of the CPU to notify the presence of the modem.

== PDA models that used the Palm Serial connector ==
- Pilot 1000
- Pilot 5000
- PalmPilot Personal
- PalmPilot Professional
- Palm III
- Palm IIIe
- Palm IIIx
- Palm IIIxe
- Palm VII
- Palm VIIx
- Palm m100
- Palm m105
- TRGpro
- Handera 330
- Symbol 1500
- Symbol 1550
