= Fossil Wrist PDA =

Early consumer smartwatch

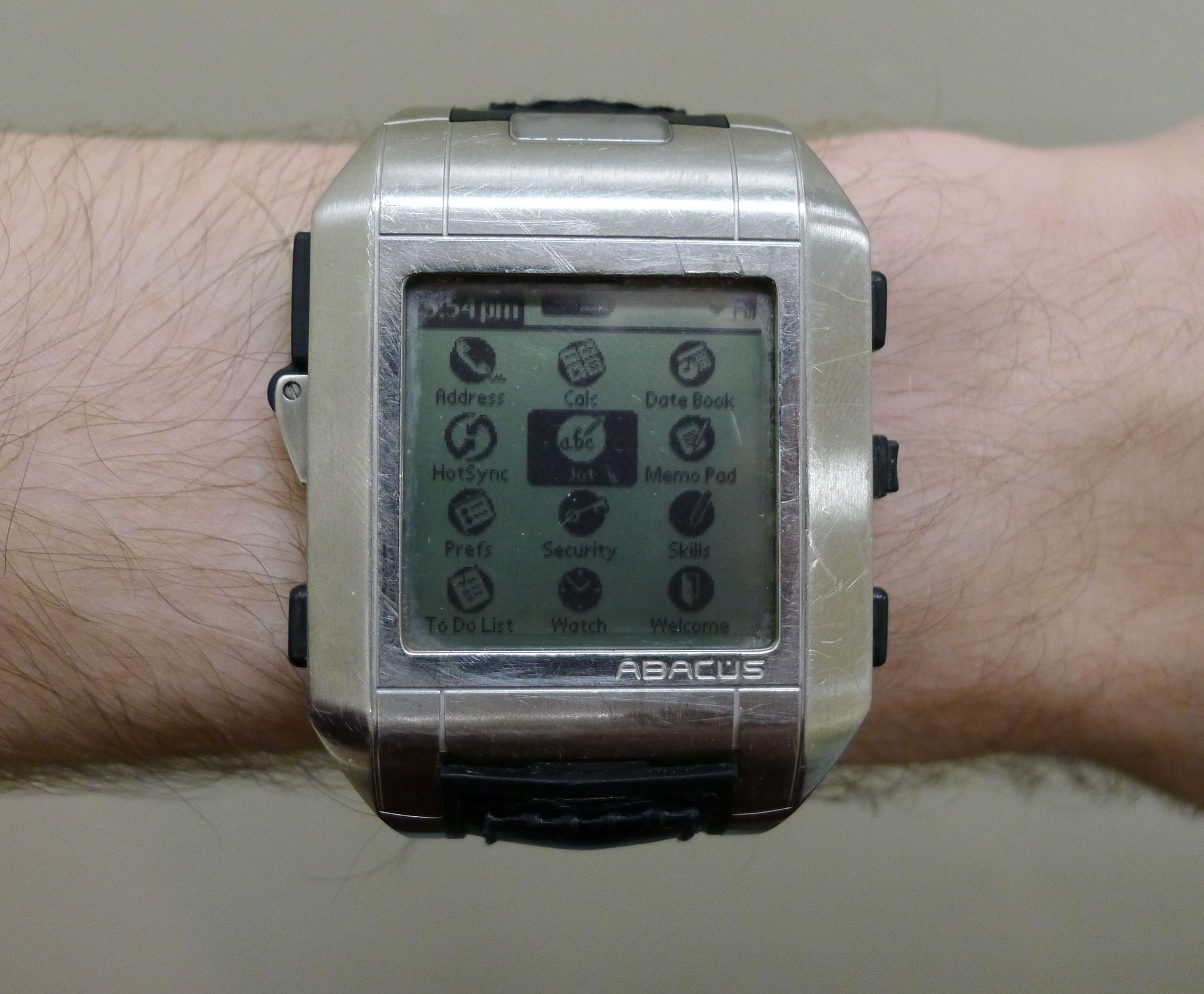
- Manufacturer: Fossil Group
- Type: Smartwatch
- Released: 2003
- Lifespan: 2003–5
- Introductory price: $250
- Operating system: Palm OS 4.1.2
- CPU: Motorola DragonBall Super VZ 66 MHz
- Memory: 8 MB (RAM), 4 MB (Flash) (approximately 7.7 MB RAM available)
- Display: 160 × 160 pixels, 16 level greyscale, EL backlight, Touch Screen
- Connectivity: USB, IRDA (v1.2a)
- Power: DC (6V), Lithium-ion
- Weight: 108g (5.7oz)
- Successor: Fossil WristNET watch

The Fossil Wrist PDA is a smartwatch that runs Palm OS. The newer incarnation, which does not include Palm OS, is called the Fossil WristNet watch.

== Product history ==
The development of the Fossil Wrist PDA began in 1999 when engineer Donald Brewer and Fossil Product Manager Jeff Bruneau licensed a read-only version of the Palm OS from Palm Source and tried to make it work in a watch. For the first year of development, Brewer struggled to make the watch small enough to be wearable. The initial designs looked like "a cell phone glued on one's wrist" and in board meetings the term "boat anchor" was used. He began to talk with Microsoft engineers, who were looking for a wrist-top platform as well and were busy developing Smart Personal Objects Technology (SPOT watches). Once the size was decreased, the next major hurdle was making the screen. The smallest screens available at the time were cell phone screens that had 90 by 126 pixels. Palm OS, however, was written for a touch-sensitive 160- by 160-pixel screen. Re-working the code would be a massive undertaking, so engineers began to look for suppliers that could deliver the new technology. An engineering firm in Arizona called Three-Five Systems was able to deliver the display in July 2002. The resulting device was rushed to the COMDEX convention where it won the "best of COMDEX" award for "best mobile device". The original prototype had 2 MB of memory, which was expanded to 8 MB for the commercial release. The price at debut was $249 US.

== Features ==
The AU/FX series are able to carry out most PDA functions and applications. Like other Palm OS devices, they synchronize or exchange information with a PC, have an infrared port, a virtual keyboard, and a touch screen. It supports most of the features of the graffiti handwriting recognition system. A tiny stylus can be stored in the watch clasp. Two buttons and a rocker switch on the side assist with navigating lists and menus. The screen resolution is equivalent to a Palm III, and an electroluminescent backlight allows it to be used at night. An IRDA transmitter on the front allows it to communicate with other Palm devices. In addition, there are Palm applications that allow the IRDA transmitter to be used as a TV remote, but transmission range is very low in this case. The watch uses a rechargeable lithium ion battery. In standby mode, when it turns off between uses, the battery can last a week or more. The device has a watch program, with several "watch faces" to continuously display the time. When in watch-face mode the battery life is around 1-2 days, depending on the integrity of the battery.

== Reception ==
Initially, the Wrist PDA received positive reviews. In 2003 Wired.com called it "revolutionary" and a "Dick Tracy watch". Reviewers noted that it was able to run a wide variety of software such as DocumentsToGo 6, AvantGo, Palm Games and the freeware Metro Navigator.

Reviewers mainly complained about the bulky size and appearance. One reviewer noted that with a weight of 108 grams, it weighs nearly as much as the Handspring Visor PDA, which is 174 g. Reviewers also complained that the screen was too dim and small to read and use for manipulating text. Other problems included having poor water-resistance, low battery life and an alarm that was too quiet for practical use.

== Gallery ==
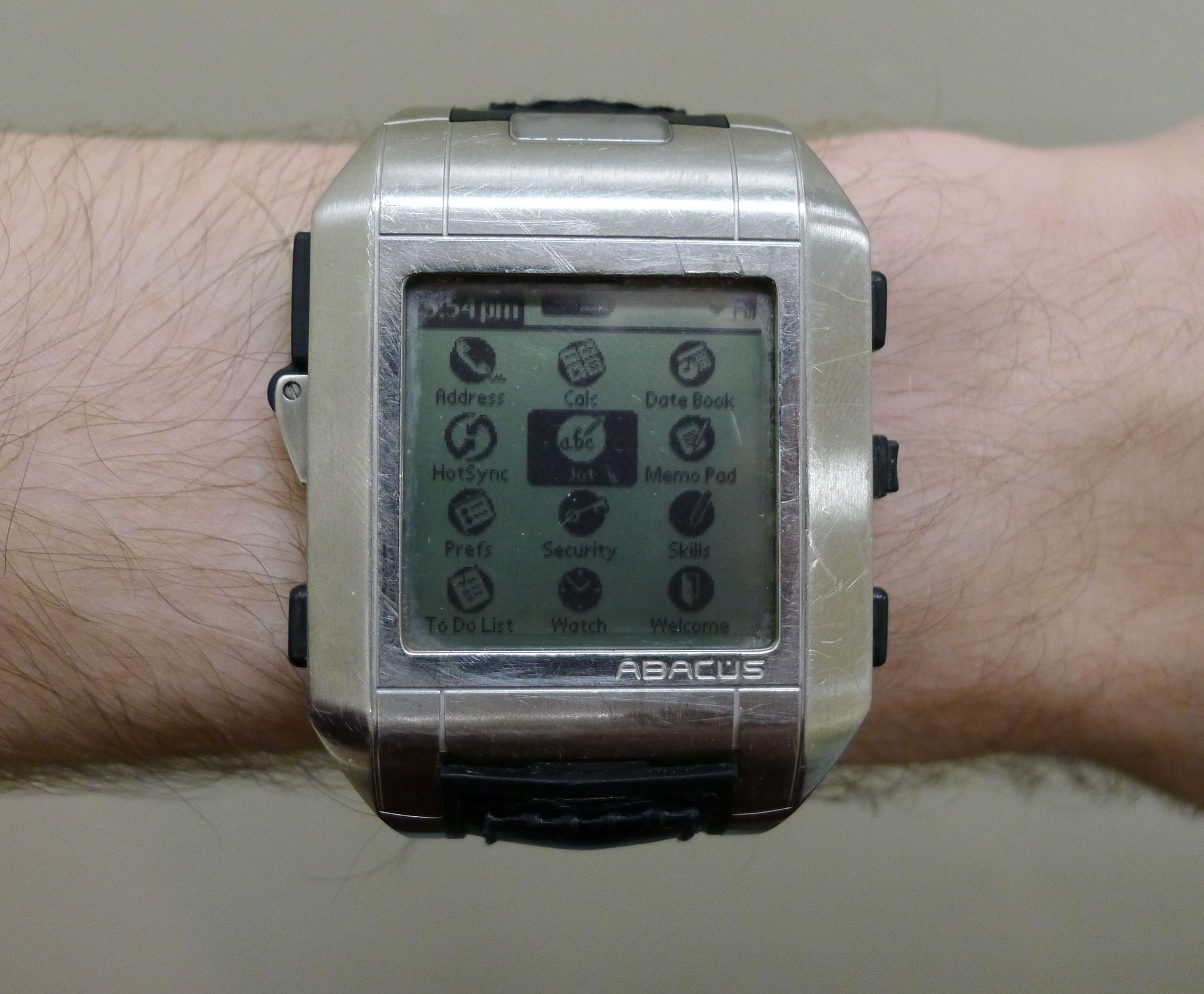
On wrist

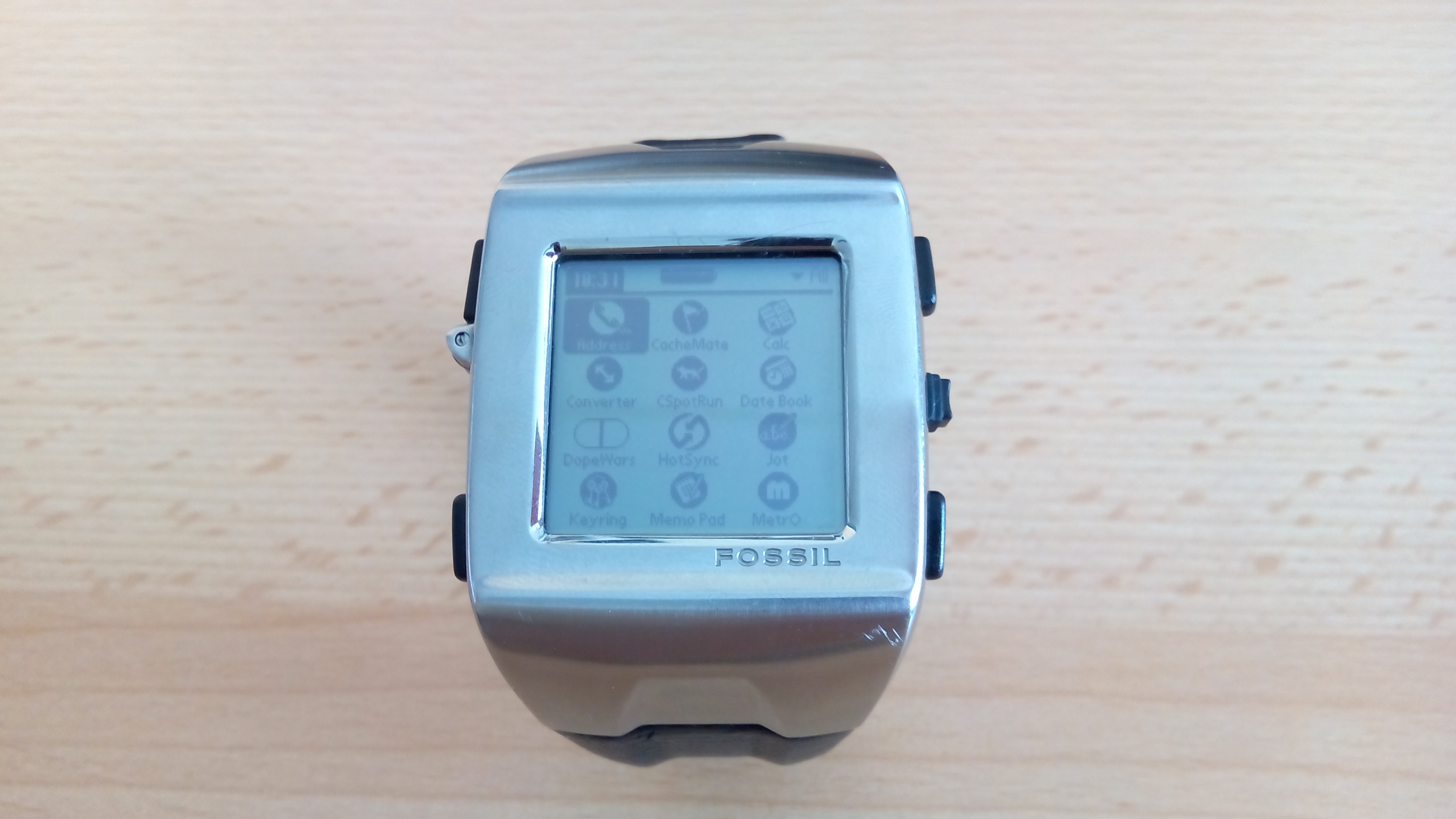
Standalone front view

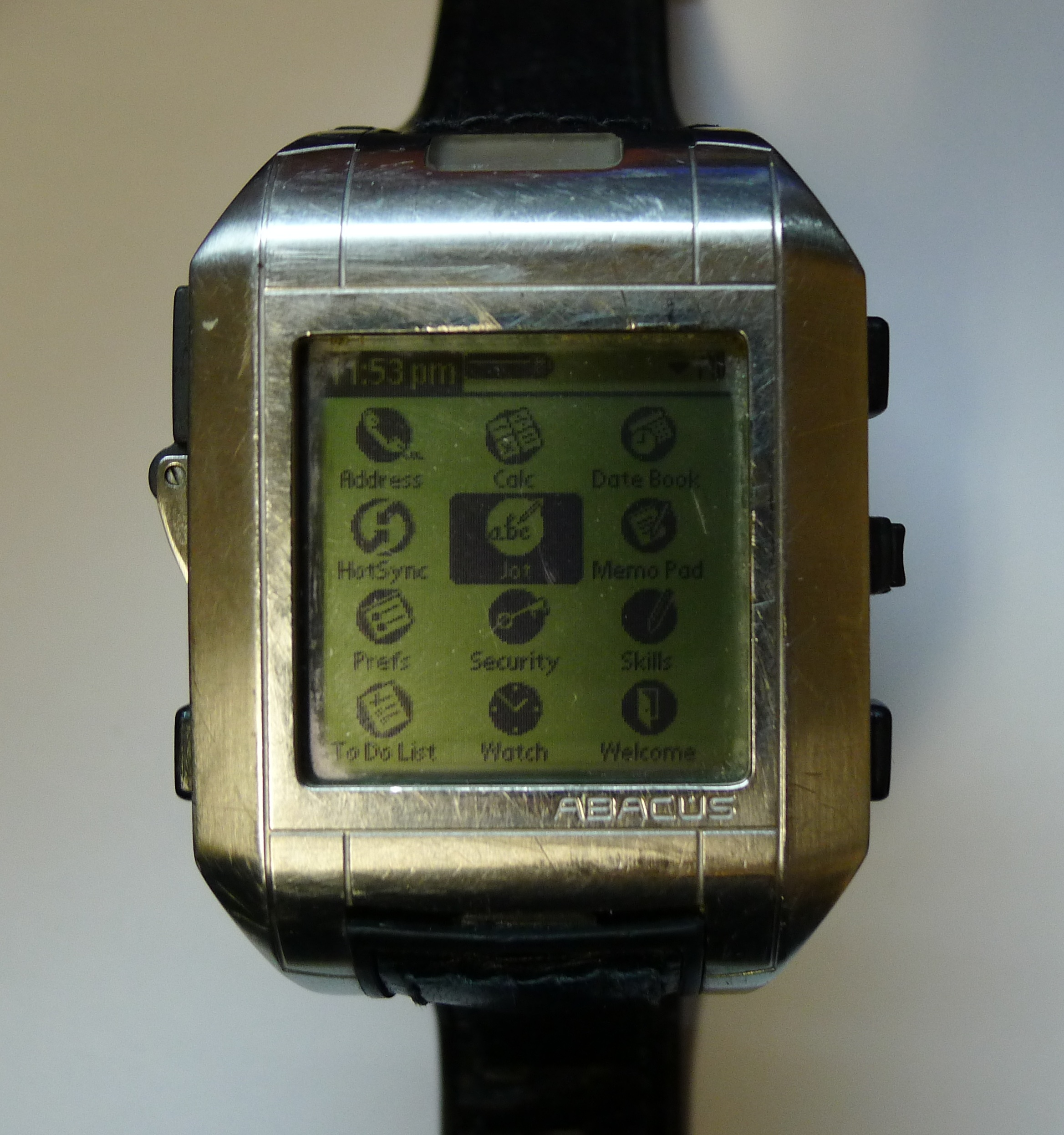
Front view

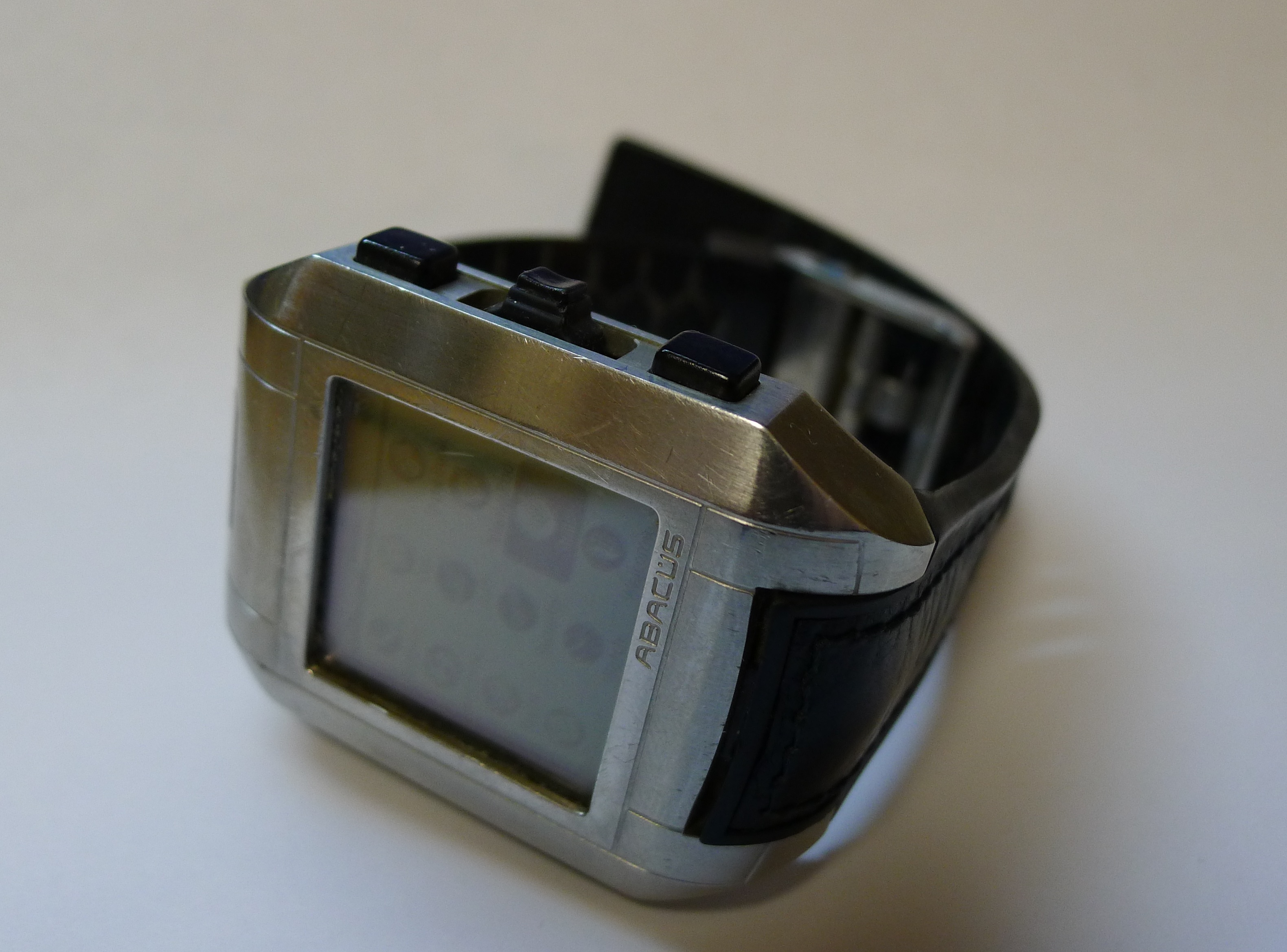
Side view

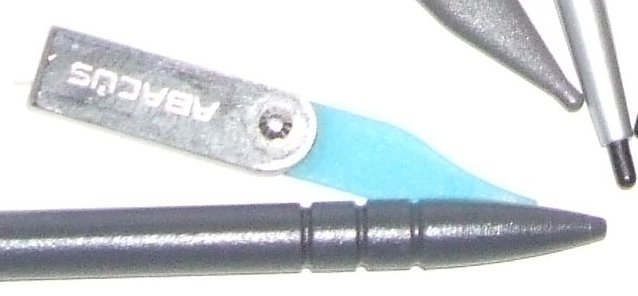
Stylus

== See also ==
- Pebble (watch)
- Apple Watch
- Wearable computer
- Wristwatch computer
- I'm Watch
