= Sony CLIÉ PEG-SJ22 =

Handheld personal digital assistant

Clie PEG-SJ22
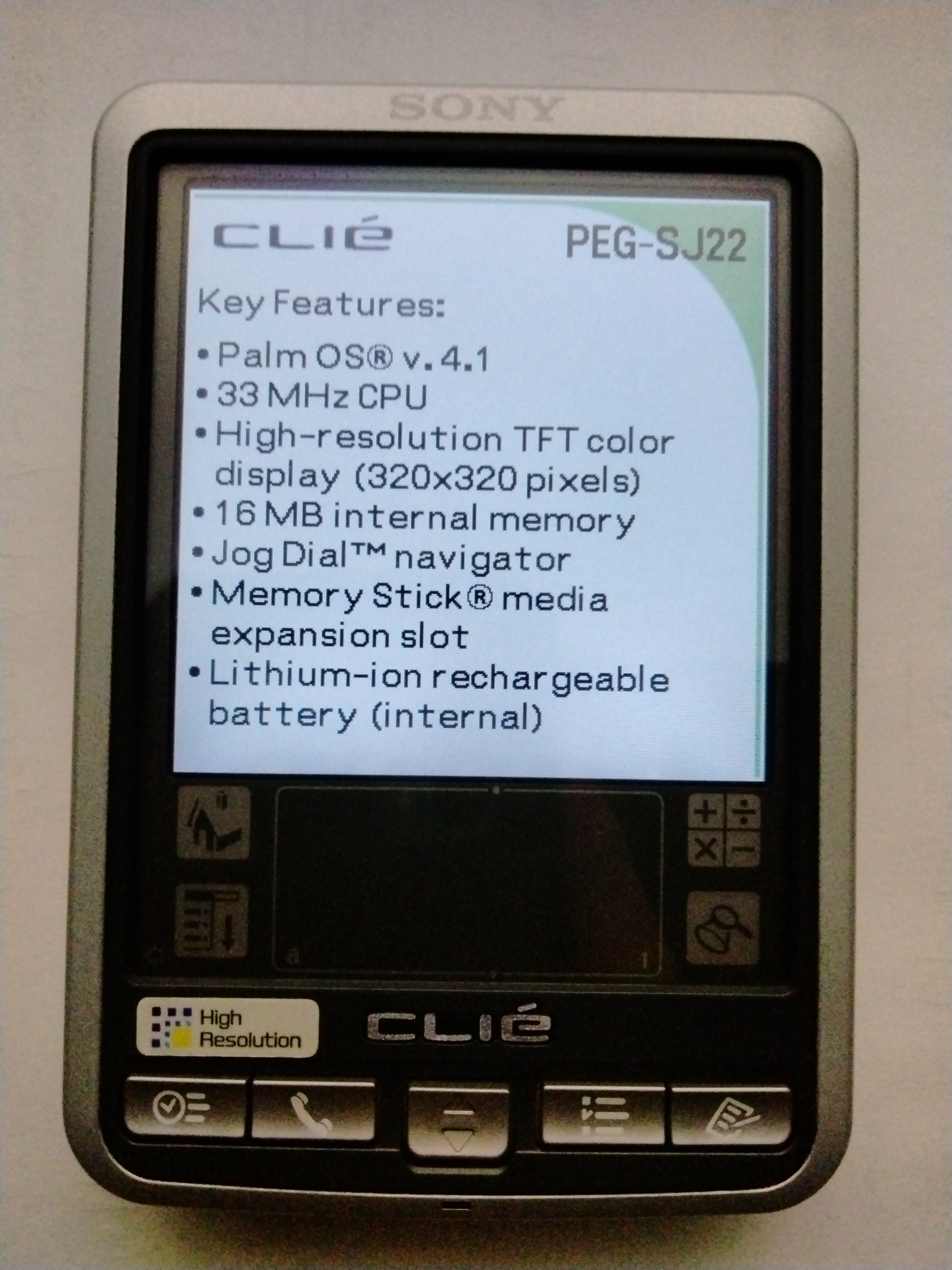
- Front view of the Clie PEG-SJ22
- Manufacturer: Sony
- Type: PDA
- Media: 16 MB internal RAM, 15 MB available
- Operating system: Palm OS 4.1
- CPU: 33 MHz Motorola MC68VZ328
- Display: 320x320 16-bit color (65,536 colors) TFT active-matrix display
- Input: Touchscreen, jog dial
- Touchpad: Entire screen
- Connectivity: Infrared, USB through proprietary connector, Memory Stick slot
- Power: Li-ion battery
- Dimensions: 104 x 71.8 x 16.8 mm

The Sony CLIÉ PEG-SJ22 was a Palm OS based handheld "Personal Entertainment Organizer" released by Sony in 2003, it is a very similar device to the Sony CLIÉ PEG-SJ30 with a slightly different software package.

It was released to be the entry-level model and only ran Palm OS 4.1, not the newly released Palm OS 5. It is in effect a personal digital assistant with a few multimedia features. Sony bundled the Kinoma Video Player with the device, although out of the box it only had sound output in the form of a Piezo-buzzer. This resulted in very poor sound quality without the optional Stereo Audio Adapter. Also bundled were the Sony PictureGear Pocket application, which allowed the retrieval of images from Memory Stick media or the optional Memory Stick camera and the Photostand application, which allowed use of the Clié as a Digital photo frame.

Other notable mentions are World Alarm Clock, a world clock application which, like all other Clié applications, takes full advantage of the Clié's high resolution display, and Clié Paint, which is a simple paint application that create or edit pictures stored on the device (including those in PictureGear Pocket).

Due to the Clié having a High-resolution display, Sony included a new technology to Palm OS 4.1, called HiRes, which allowed applications written for 160x160pixel Palm OS devices to make full use of the 320x320 display. In practice it worked very well with most applications and could be selectively disabled for those applications which did not.

Another technology included is called JogAssist, which gave the user more control over the Palm OS by using the Jog wheel. It could be set so that when the Jog wheel's back button was held down for a few seconds, it would show a cursor over the on-screen elements and allow the user to modify them without using the stylus. Holding the back button for slightly longer instead selected the Palm OS menu from the current application, which could also be augmented with up to 3 shortcuts to regularly used tasks from: Power Off, Applications, Keyboard, Calc, Find, Backlight or Brightness.

For a device with all these features as this price point (£149 GBP, $199 US), the PEG-SJ22 proved to be a popular device. It was the cheapest color Clié available and replaced the last greyscale Clié, the Sony CLIÉ PEG-SL10.
