= Sony CLIÉ PEG-SJ33 =

The Sony CLIÉ PEG-SJ33 was a Palm OS based handheld "Personal Entertainment Organizer" released by Sony in 2003. It was released with a heavy multimedia focus, one of its key features being the inclusion of MP3 player software and built-in stereo sound hardware (a rarity on Palm OS devices in 2003). The PEG-SJ33 has the same HiRes screen as the other low-end colour CLIÉ models. This device was later superseded by the Clie TJ Series.

== Specifications ==
- Palm OS:4.1
- CPU: Motorola DragonBall Super VZ 66 MHz
- Input devices: Touchscreen with silkscreen Graffiti area, 4 shortcut buttons, up/down buttons, Jog Dial with select back buttons, hold switch
- Memory: 16MB internal
- Display: 320 X 320, 16-bit color
- External connectors: PEG-SL/SJ/T connector, 3.5mm headphone jack
- Expansion: Memory Stick
- Included Accessories: Stylus, Hand Strap, translucent flip cover, Sony Power/USB dongle, Power Supply, mini-USB lead
- Optional Accessories: Memory Stick media (not pro, indicated as such on the box), Memory Stick Bluetooth Adapter, Memory Stick camera, Cradle, Game Controller, Mini Keyboard, Various cases, coloured flip covers
- Wireless: Infrared
- Batteries: Internal Li-On
- Color: Silver w/ black cover (standard), other colour covers available
- Form factor: similar to Palm III
- Size: 108x74x23mm (HxWxD) with cover closed

== See also ==
- Clie TJ Series, the successor to the Sj33.
