= Palm IIIxe =

Discontinued Palm PDA

- Manufacturer: Palm, Inc.
- Type: Personal digital assistant
- Media: 8 MB RAM
- Operating system: Palm OS 3.5 can be upgraded to 4.1
- CPU: 16 MHz Motorola 68328EZ Dragonball
- Display: 160 x 160 px, monochrome, super-twisted nematic LCD
- Input: touchscreen
- Camera: None
- Connectivity: DE9 serial port, infrared port
- Power: 2 x AAA batteries

The Palm IIIxe is a discontinued Palm personal digital assistant that was designed and manufactured by Palm, Inc. It cost US$249 when new.

== Product data ==
Manufacturer's part number: 3C80304U

=== Dimensions ===
- Width: 8.1 cm (3.19 in)
- Depth: 1.8 cm (0.71 in)
- Height: 12 cm (4.72 in)
- Weight: 170 g (0.37 lb)

=== Operating system requirements ===
Note: these requirements are for the Palm Desktop PIM software that originally shipped with the Palm IIIxe.

OS Required: Apple Mac OS 7.5.3 or later, Microsoft Windows 95, Microsoft Windows 98, Microsoft Windows NT 4.0 or later.

== Features ==
A Palm IIIxe unit with Accessories.

Palm IIIxe Hotsync Cradle.

The Palm IIIxe was introduced into the marketplace in February 2000 as one of the two remaining models (the other being the Palm IIIc) in the III series line of Palm's Personal Digital Assistants.

The Palm IIIxe unit came in a black flip lid with an infrared port at top which lets users beam memos, addresses, etc. between Palm handhelds or to another device with an IrDA-compliant port. With the right software, the IIIxe can also be used as a universal remote control.

At the bottom of the unit is a serial port for hotsyncing to the user's desktop computer by way of a cradle. The serial port can also support various peripherals including the PalmPix camera, and The Stowaway foldable and Gotype keyboards.

Like other Palms in the series, the bottom portion of the screen features a silkscreen used by the Graffiti input system, and to provide shortcuts to the calculator, application list, application menu and search. The unit comes with seven physical buttons: power/backlight, Date Book, Address Book, up and down scroll buttons, To Do list, and Memo Pad. All the buttons except for the scroll buttons can be used to turn on the unit.

The IIIxe features a 16 MHz Motorola 68328 EZ Dragonball CPU, and is powered by two AAA batteries which can last up to a month or two depending on use. It also features the same enhanced 160x160 pixel grayscale super-twisted nematic display area as the Palm IIIe and Palm IIIx, but with a 4-bit display (16 greyscales), 8 MB of RAM and 2 MB of internal flash memory for system upgrades and third party applications. The unit shipped with Palm OS 3.5, but can be patched to later versions. Palm OS 3.5.2 fixed a memory leak in version 3.5 of the Palm OS, and Palm OS 3.5.3 fixed a flow control problem and a dynamic UI pointer issue that caused incompatibilities with some 3rd party applications. The latest version of Palm OS that runs on the IIIxe is version 4.1, released in November 2001. Unlike the free version 3.5 updates, Palm OS 4.1 was available only as a paid upgrade on CD-ROM.

A peculiar note about the Palm III series was that the top battery inserts "backwards", as the positive terminal on the battery contacts the battery compartment spring; however, the bottom battery inserts the usual way with the negative terminal on the battery touching the spring in the battery compartment. NiMH batteries can be used to extend runtime and reduce waste alkaline batteries.

Some Palm IIIc, IIIxe, and Vx units manufactured between October 1999 through May 2000 had a DRAM defect that could overwrite user data randomly. Palm has released diagnostics and a patch to correct this problem.
