= Garmin iQue =

Garmin GPS-enabled PDAs

iQue (/aɪˈkjuː/ eye-KYOO; like "IQ") was a line of personal digital assistants (PDA) with integrated Global Positioning System (GPS) receivers sold by Garmin. It was introduced in 2003 and discontinued in mid-2008.

== Description ==
The Garmin iQue 3600 was among the first devices to integrate GPS technology into a PDA. The line included devices running Palm OS and Windows Mobile operating systems. As of June 2008, all iQue products have been discontinued by Garmin and are no longer being supported or repaired by the company.

Integration of address book and date book with GPS location provides convenient ways for turn-by-turn voice guided navigation.

All devices include the Que software, including map display, auto-routing, search for points of interest and addresses in the map database, etc.

All devices have Wide Area Augmentation System (WAAS) and European Geostationary Navigation Overlay Service (EGNOS) abilities.

Popular accessories include external GPS antennas, vehicle mounts, power adaptors and external speakers.

== Que software ==
The Que software provides integration (with address and datebook), navigation and mapping.

- QueMap - map display
- QueFind - search by various criteria through the database: address, points of interests, cities, services, facilities, etc.
- QueGPS - satellite signal display
- QueTracks - collects and manages GPS tracks
- QueRoutes - routing and voice guidance preferences
- QueTurns - turn by turn route guidance, used with automatic routing
- QueTrip - statistics

== List of products ==
=== Palm OS devices ===
- iQue 3600 - Palm OS 5, 480x320 pixel display, voice recorder
- iQue 3600a - Similar to an iQue 3600 but designed for aviation use
- iQue 3200 - Palm OS 5, 320x320 pixel display, SDIO capable
- iQue 3000 - Palm OS 5, 320x320 pixel display, with included 128 MB microSD card

=== Pocket PC devices ===
- iQue M5 - Windows Mobile 2003 SE, 240x320 pixel display, SDIO/MMC compatible, Bluetooth
- iQue M3 - Windows Mobile 2003 SE, 240x320 pixel display, SDIO compatible, 3D mapping
- iQue M4 - Windows Mobile 2003 SE, 240x320 pixel display, SDIO compatible, preloaded maps, 3D mapping

=== Related products ===
- cfQue 1620 - CompactFlash extension for Windows Mobile OS PDAs; discontinued in 2006.
- GPS 10 (10R) - Bluetooth GPS receiver, compatible with both Palm PDAs and Pocket PCs, and personal computers running Microsoft Windows.
- Garmin Mobile 10 (10X) - Bluetooth GPS receiver that works together with some smartphones including Windows Mobile based, Palm based, BlackBerry and Symbian. This device is about the size of a pager and can be worn on the belt using the belt clip that is provided.
- Garmin Mobile 20 (20SM) - Bluetooth GPS receiver that functions as a cradle that a compatible smartphone can sit in. This device requires 12V for power and can only be used in a vehicle with a 12V system. The 20SM comes with various types of power adapters that can charge various types of phones and PDAs.

== Competitors ==
- MiTAC
- TomTom
- Magellan
- Lowrance
- Sony
