= Sony CLIÉ PEG-SL10 =

The Sony CLIÉ PEG-SL10 is a personal digital assistant made by Sony. It was released in 2002 alongside PEG-SJ20 and PEG-SJ30, two higher end models features better screen and built-in lithium battery. All three products feature with Motorola Dragonball VZ 33Mhz Processor and Palm OS 4.1S.

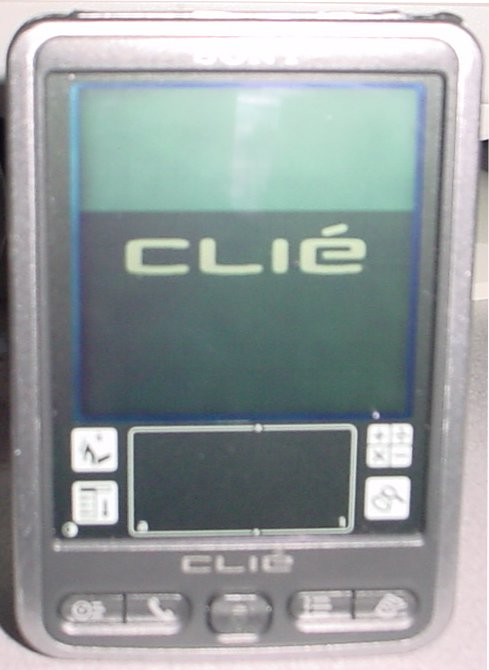
A Clie PEG-SL10

SL-10 is the only model in the SL series and the last model to use AAA battery in the CLIÉ product line. Like most CLIÉ products, it includes a few variants designated to different regions: PEG-SL10/U, PEG-SL10/E, and PEG-SL/J.

== Specifications ==
- Palm OS: 4.1S
- CPU: Motorola DragonBall VZ 33 MHz
- Input devices: Touchscreen, Graffiti, Jog Dial with back button
- RAM: 8MB
- ROM: 4MB
- Display: 320 X 320, 4-bit grayscale
- Backlit: Yes, Green Color Backlit
- External connectors: PEG-SL/SJ/T connector, Mini USB
- Expansion: Memory Stick, up to 256MB
- Wireless: Infrared
- Batteries: 2 AAA
- Color: Silver with black face
- Form factor: similar to Palm III
- Size: Weight: 3.6 oz, Dimensions: 4.1 x 2.9 x 0.7 in - smaller than a Palm IIIc and slightly smaller (but thicker) than a Palm TX

== Bundled Software ==
- CLIE Paint
- gMovie
- PhotoStand
- PG Pocket
