= Palm P850 =

Palm OS–based Chinese smartphone released by Palm in 2010

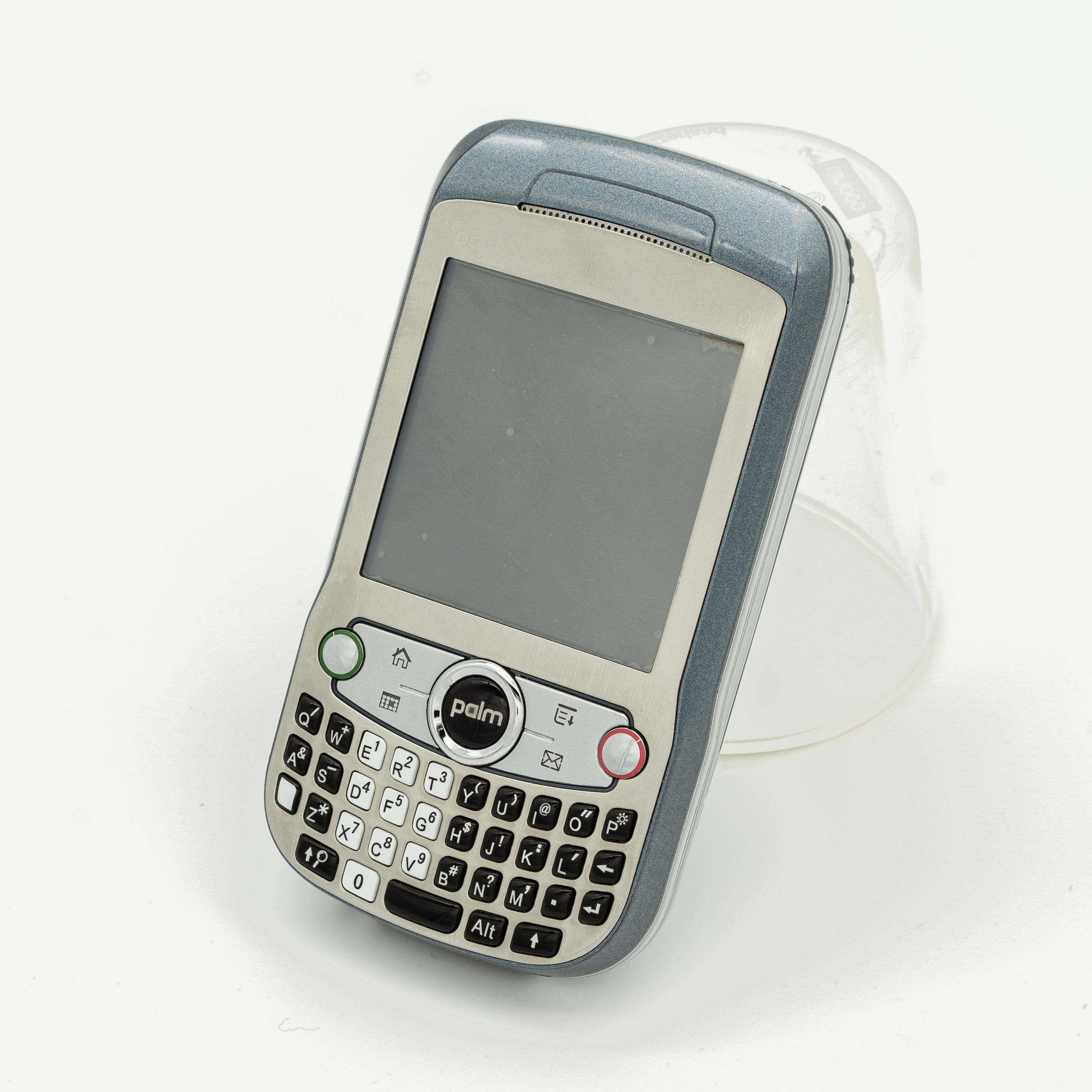
- Manufacturer: Palm
- Type: Smartphone
- Released: January 2010
- Media: MMC, SD, SDIO
- Operating system: Palm OS 5.2H
- CPU: Intel PXA270 312 MHz processor with Intel XScale technology
- Storage: 32MB (22MB user available)
- Display: 2.7-inch 320×320 16-bit illuminated TFT LCD
- Input: Keypad, touchscreen
- Camera: 1.3-megapixel
- Connectivity: CDMA2000, Bluetooth, IrDA
- Power: 1800 mAh battery
- Dimensions: 113 × 59 × 23mm
- Weight: 178g
- Predecessor: Treo 650

The Palm P850 or Palm Treo P850, is a Palm OS-based smartphone released in 2010. This device was a minor update of the Treo 650, tailored specifically for the Chinese market and sold as a low-cost smartphone option.

== Device Release ==
In early 2009 Palm CEO Ed Colligan declared that there would be no new Palm OS devices released following the Palm Centro, and that the company was reportedly working hard on their next-generation operating system. However, at the start of 2010 the Palm P850 was quietly released in China as a low-cost smartphone option, selling for 560-700CNY outright, and was selling for as low as 200CNY by late 2011. Available exclusively with Chinese localization, the existence of this device was not broadly discussed outside of Asia; it is speculated that the device is an unofficial "Shanzhai", and that these devices are originally Treo 650 units that have been locally refurbished and modified.

== Hardware & Design ==
The styling of the device has some similarities to other Treo devices, such as the call and end buttons on the Palm Treo Pro. The device construction is plastic, with a touchscreen that is flush with the bezels, unlike other Treo models with a raised bezel. There is an SD expansion slot on the top of the device, which allows the use of SD cards for expanding storage, or SDIO cards for adding extra capabilities such as Wi-Fi. The rear housing is conspicuously marked with "smart phone" in white silk-screened text.

The device internal hardware is essentially identical to a CDMA Treo 650 which was notably released over five years prior, but now with an added SIM card slot to support the requirements of Chinese mobile networks, and a marginally improved camera. The markings on the device's regulatory label (located under the battery) correspond exactly with the CDMA Treo 650 model, featuring an identical FCC ID (O8FMADECA) and UPC (805931014801). During start-up, the device also displays the PalmOne logo; this logo was used on the Treo 650 at its release, but was depreciated following the merger of PalmOne and PalmSource in 2005. The Palm P850 also runs the 5.2H version of Palm OS, which was outdated at the time of device release.

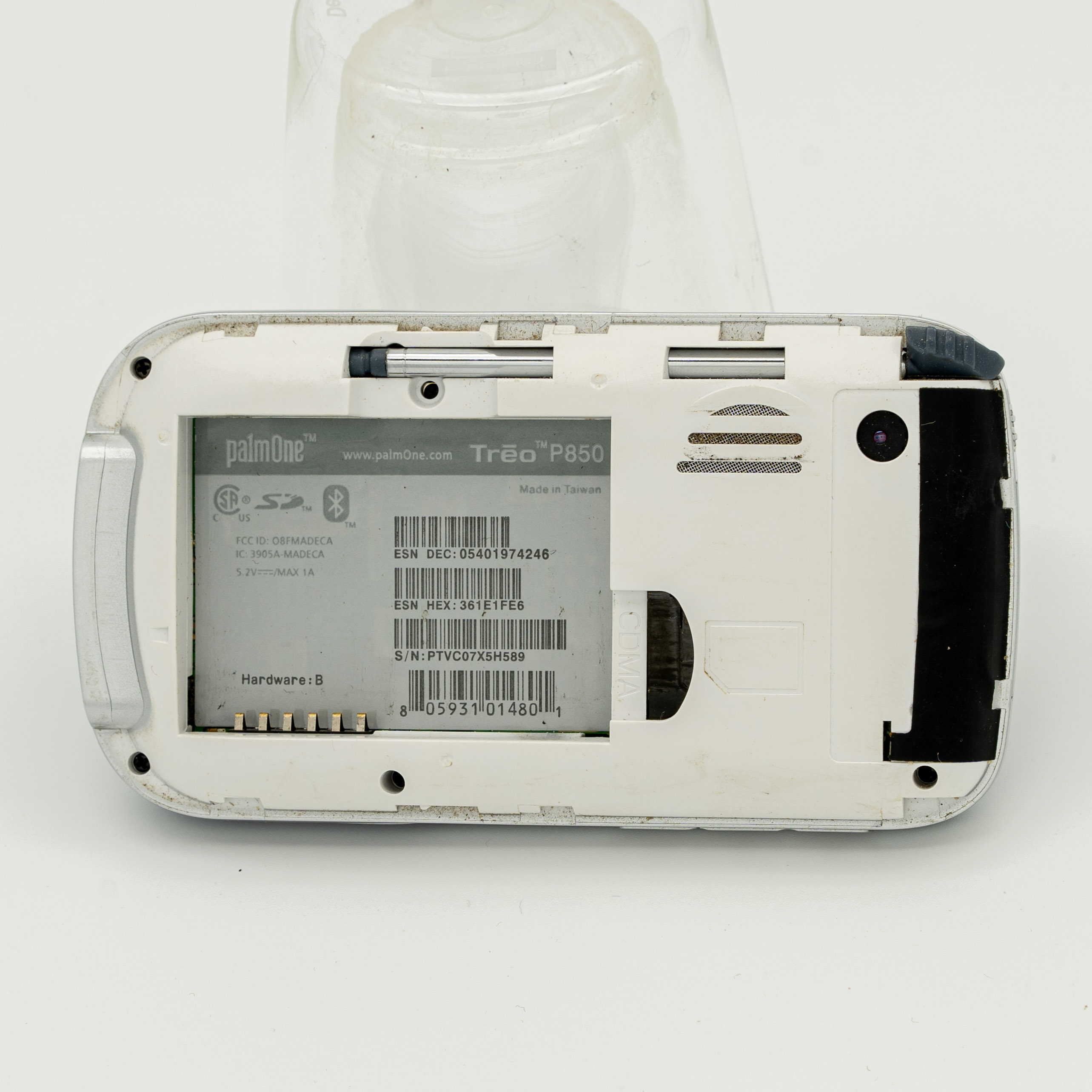
Palm-P850-FCC

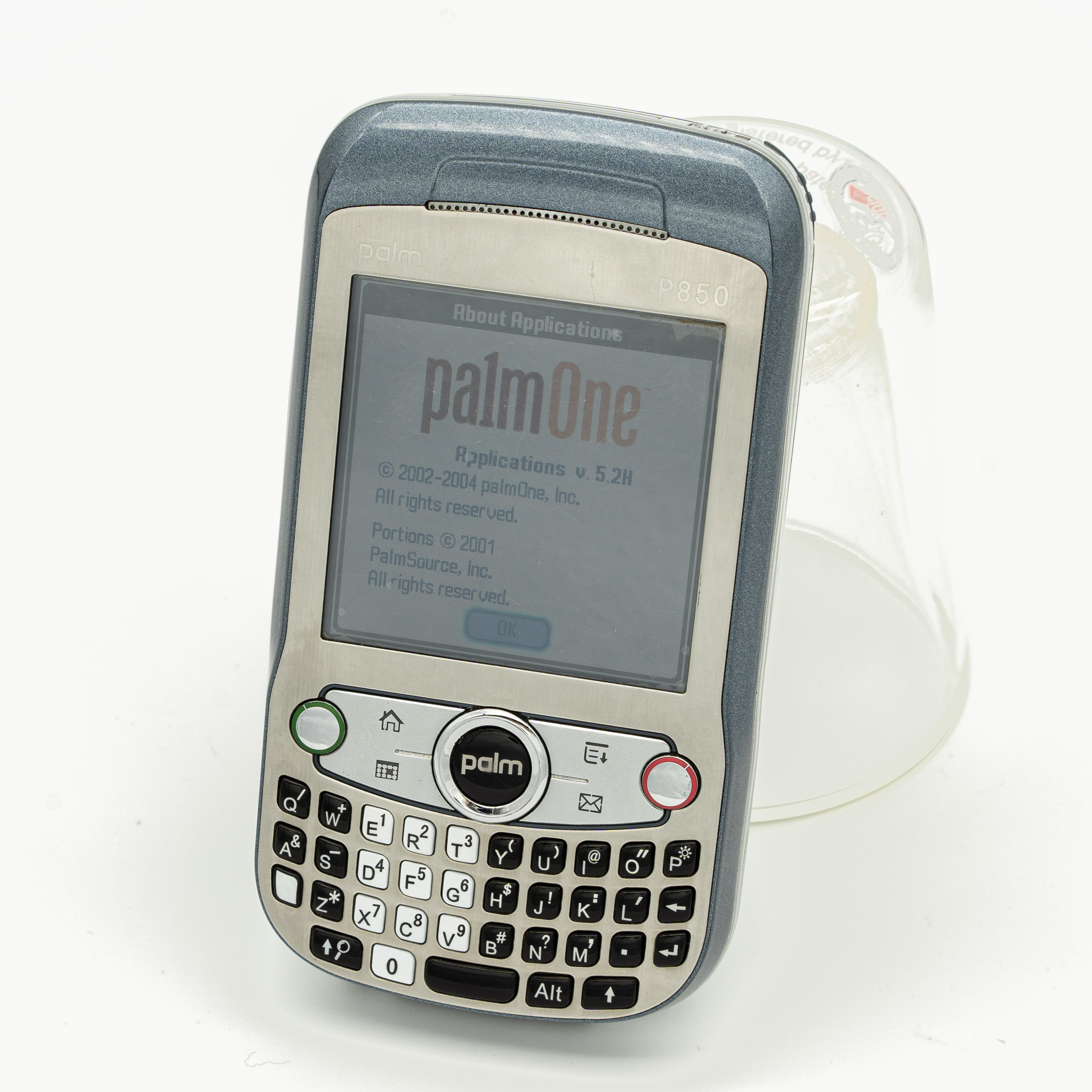
Palm-P850-PalmOne

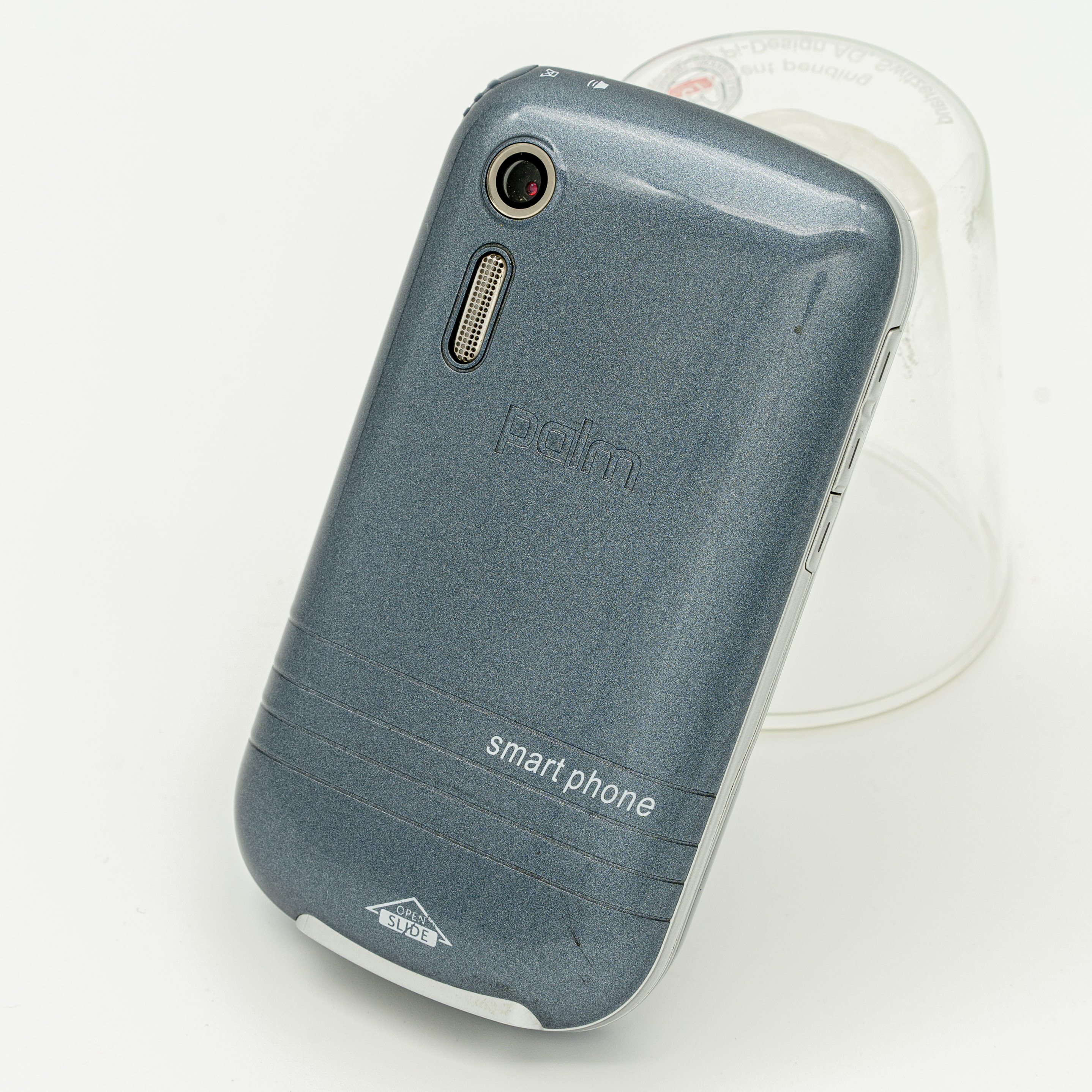
Palm-P850-Back

== See also ==
- Palm Treo smartphones
- Treo 650
