= Sony CLIÉ PEG-NZ90 =

Handheld PDA model

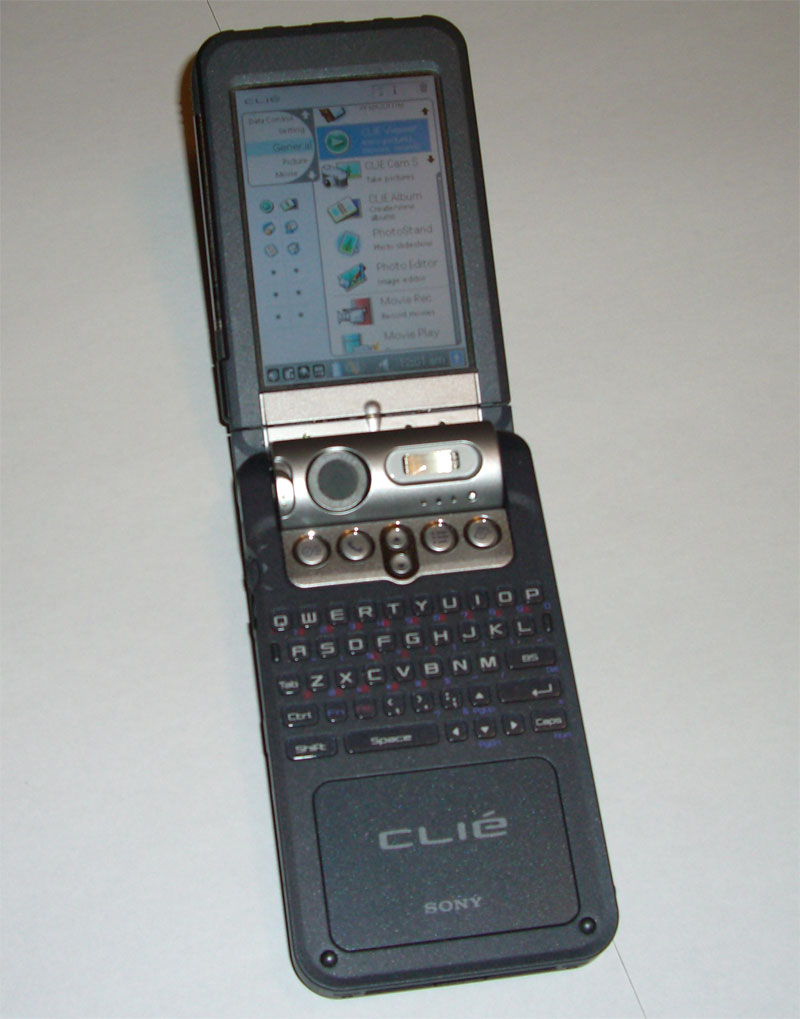
A Sony CLIÉ PEG-NZ90 Personal Entertainment Organiser model featuring a respectable multimedia specification.

The Sony Clie PEG-NZ90 was a flagship handheld PDA announced by Sony in January 2003. This model was feature-packed, further improving on the capabilities of the NX series models. Like its predecessors, this handheld had a vertical clamshell swivel-screen form factor, and was powered by a 200mhz Intel XScale CPU, running the Palm OS (version 5).

The main improvement to this model, were the addition of a Xenon camera flash, and a higher-resolution 2MP built-in CCD camera with both autofocus and a macro mode. This camera was state-of-the-art for the time; capable 2MP cameras with flash were not commonly seen in mobile devices until several years later, such as the Sony Ericsson K750 which was released in 2005.

The device was criticised for only featuring 16MB of storage, which was seen as poor value for the high retail price.

In contrast to the NZ90/E and NZ90/U export models, the Japanese NZ90 featured a contactless FeliCa card reader. This enabled users to check the balance and usage history on an Edy (prepaid-money) card or a Japan Rail Pass (prepaid travel) card such as Suica.

Over time, a number of these devices have suffered from design defects. In particular, the Sony CCD used had a tendency to fail over time, due to humidity affecting down the bonding substrate used in the CCD assembly. This failure mode affected many other CCD-based products at the time, including the Clie NX80V PDA, as well as a number of Sony digital camera models. The LCD displays used on this model also had a tendency to be easily damaged.

== Specifications ==
Specifications from Palm Info Center.

- Palm OS: 5.0
- CPU: Intel XScale PXA250 200 MHz
- Memory: 16MB RAM (11MB avail.), 16MB ROM
- Display: 480 x 320 transflective back-lit TFT-LCD, 16bit Colour (65k colours)
- Sound: Internal audio amplifier, Rear speaker, Mono Mic, Stereo Headphone out.
- External Connectors: USB
- Expansion: Memory Stick Pro, MSIO, Compact Flash (Type II), Wireless LAN (In form of Compact Flash expansion card sold separately by Sony)
- Wireless: Infrared IrDA
- Battery: Rechargeable Li-Ion Polymer (1200 mAh)
- Size & Weight: 5.4 (H) x 2.8 (W) x 0.6-0.9 (D) inches, 10.3 oz.
- Color: Silver

== See also ==
- Sony CLIÉ UX Series - The successor to the NZ series.
