= Sony CLIÉ NR Series =

Series of personal digital assistants

Sony PEG-NR70
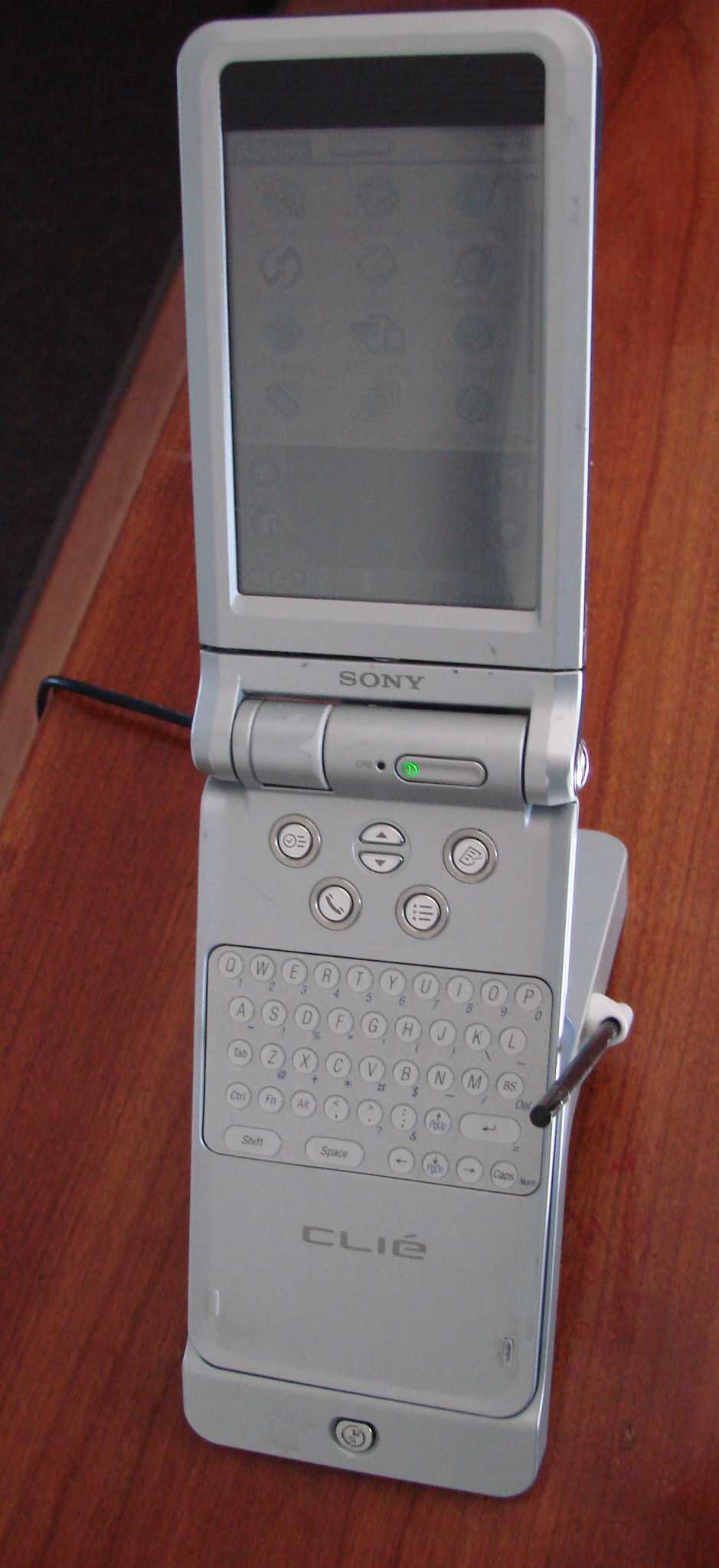
- Sony PEG-NR70V with cradle
- Manufacturer: Sony
- Type: PDA
- Media: 16 MB internal RAM
- Operating system: Palm OS 4.1 on Flash ROM
- CPU: 66 MHz Motorola DragonBall Super VZ
- Display: 320x480 pixels, 16-bit TFT
- Sound: Headphone out, internal monaural (mono) speaker
- Input: Touchscreen miniature QWERTY keyboard
- Camera: 0.1 megapixel CMOS
- Touchpad: Entire screen
- Connectivity: Infrared, USB, Memory Stick
- Power: Non-removable Lithium ion rechargeable battery

The Clie NR were a series of handheld personal digital assistants (PDAs) made by Sony, announced in March 2002. These devices were distinctive, due a folding "Flip-and-Rotate" clamshell design, with a vertical rotatable screen.

== Models ==
=== PEG-NR70 ===
The Clié PEG-NR70 was a Personal Digital Assistant (PDA) made by Sony. The device ran Palm OS (version 4.1) and featured a color display, thumb-sized keyboard and MP3/Atrac3 playback with a built-in speaker; features which were uncommon among other PDAs of its time.

==== Specifications ====
- Palm OS: 4.1
- CPU: Motorola 66 MHz MC68SZ328
- Memory: 16 MB DRAM
- Display: 320 x 480, 16bit Color
- Sound: Internal audio amplifier and speaker, Headphone out.
- External Connectors: USB
- Expansion: Memory Stick
- Wireless: Infrared
- Battery: Rechargeable Li-Ion
- Size & Weight: 7 oz
- Colour: Silver

=== PEG-NR70V ===
Otherwise identical to the NR70, the NR70V added a 0.1MP (320x240 pixel) stills camera to the device. It sold at $599.99 ($1,049 in 2024), with a $25 ($44.00 in 2024) e-mail rebate available.

== See also ==
- Sony CLIÉ NX Series: The NX series succeeds the NR series.
- Nokia N93, a cellphone with similar form factor
