= Palm III =

PDA made by Palm Computing

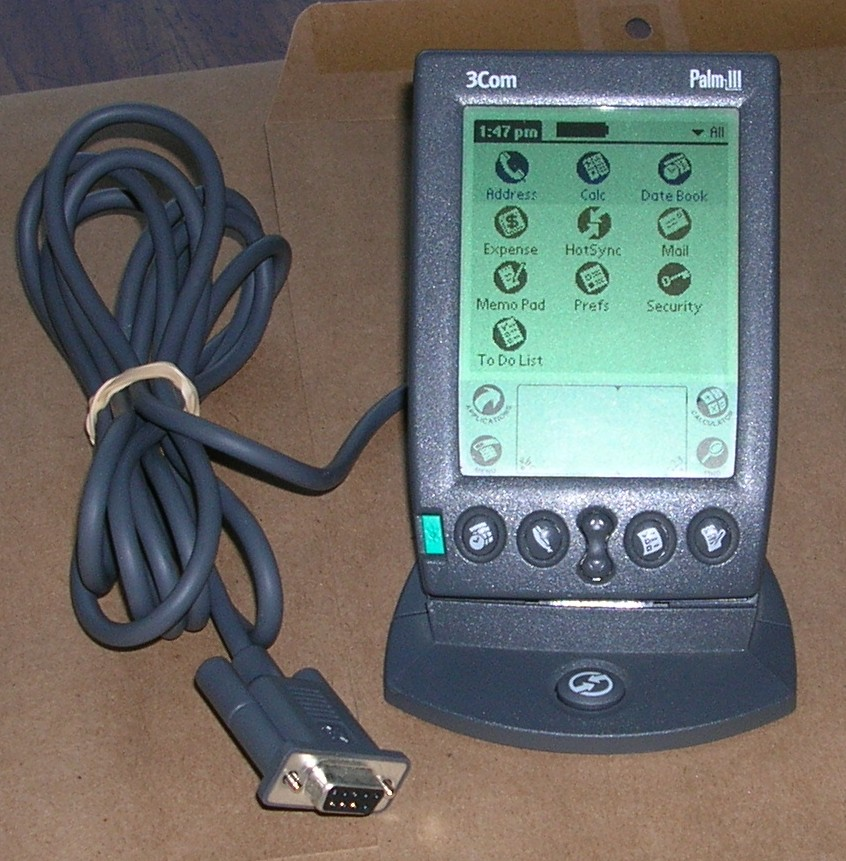
- The Palm III Connected Organizer
- Manufacturer: Palm Computing, a division of 3Com
- Type: Bar PDA
- Released: March 1998
- Operating system: Palm OS 3.0, upgradable to 3.5.3 and 4.1
- CPU: Motorola DragonBall MC68328 16 MHz
- Memory: 2 MB RAM
- Storage: 2 MB Flash ROM
- Display: 160x160 px backlit monochrome STN, 4-grayscale LCD touchscreen
- Sound: Mono loudspeaker
- Input: Touchscreen
- Camera: None
- Connectivity: IrDA, RS-232
- Power: 2x AAA Batteries
- Dimensions: 81mm x 119mm x 18mm
- Weight: 160 g (5.6 oz)
- Related: Palm IIIx, Palm IIIe, Palm IIIxe, Palm IIIc

The Palm III is a personal digital assistant that was made by the Palm Computing division of 3Com. It went on sale in 1998 as a replacement for the PalmPilot handheld. It was the first Palm handheld to support infrared file transfer and a Flash ROM-capable operating system. At release, the Palm III was priced at US$400.

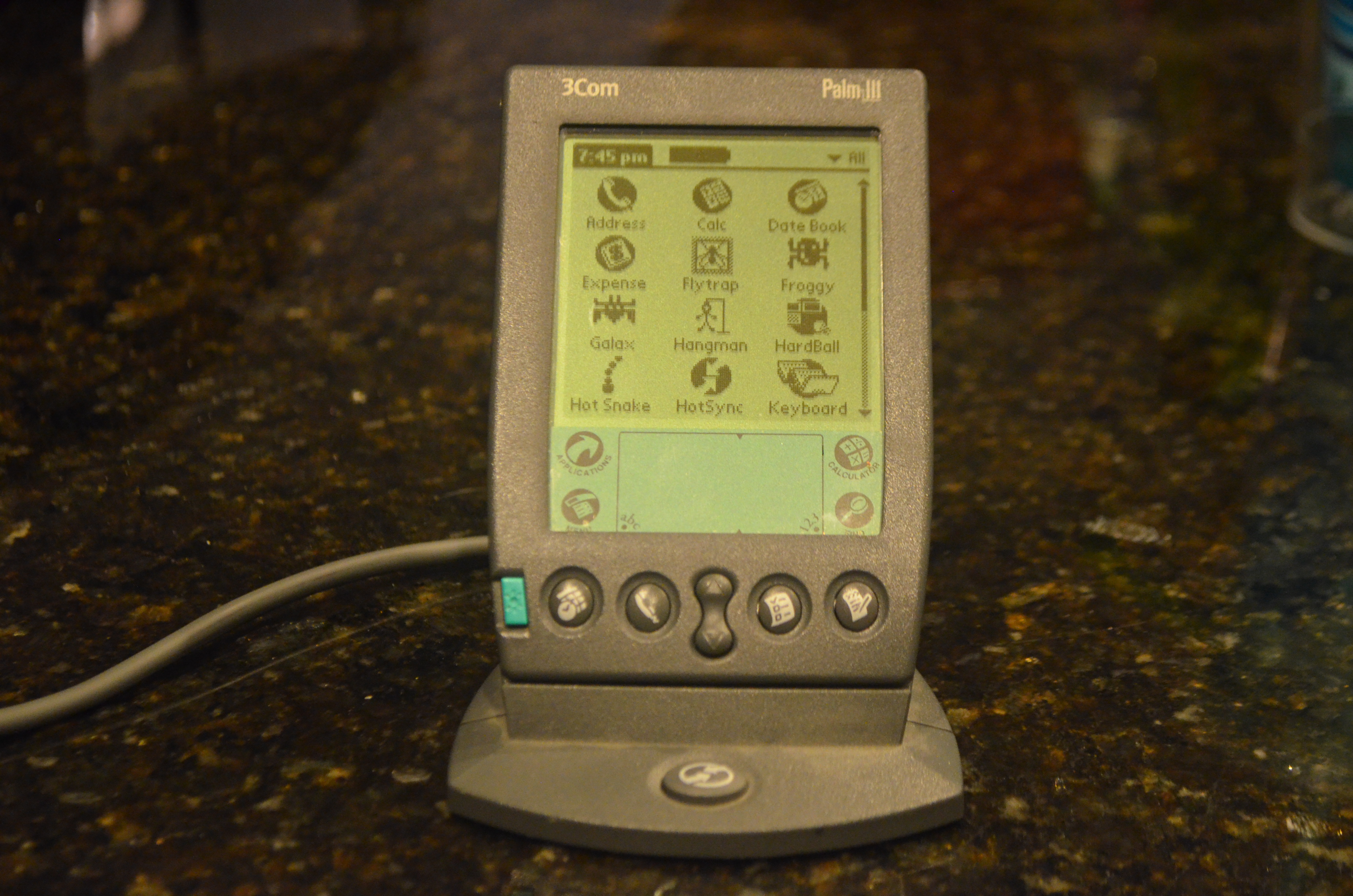
A Palm III sitting in its HotSync cradle.

== Design and features ==
At first glance, the most notable difference between the Palm III and its predecessor, the PalmPilot, is the more rugged and streamlined case. Other differences include a removable hard cover to protect the screen, removal of the memory door, a more recessed contrast adjustment knob, an infrared port, and a battery door less prone to accidentally falling off.

The Palm III ran the new Palm OS version 3.0 which featured a new application launcher, an extra font size, bug fixes, and other improvements. It featured two megabytes of EDO SDRAM for storage of user data and software and two megabytes of Flash ROM for storage of the operating system and built-in applications.

The LCD screen on the Palm III is essentially the same as that of the Palm Pilot Professional and Palm Pilot Personal which can display 2-bit greyscale. The LCD screen also has an electroluminescent backlight that can be turned on or off by holding the power button down for three seconds to allow for easier viewing in dark areas.

The Palm III had the OS ROM and RAM mounted on a memory card separate from the motherboard. This card could be replaced by a third party upgrade card to increase the Palm III's storage or functionality.

In year 2000, Kodak released The PalmPix, a digital camera with an image display on the screen for the Palm Handheld.

== Reception ==
The Palm III's main competition were Palm-size PCs running Microsoft's Windows CE. However the Palm III continued Palm's popularity and it sold well just as its predecessor. It was succeeded by Palm V.

== See also ==
- List of Palm OS Devices
