= Sony CLIÉ NX Series =

Series of handheld PDAs made by Sony

The Clie NX, were a series of handheld PDAs made by Sony, their first running the Palm OS 5.0 operating system. They had a clamshell form factor, with a vertical rotatable screen. Most of these models also had a rotatable camera built in.

== Models ==
The NX series succeeds the NR series.

=== PEG-NX60 & PEG-NX70V ===
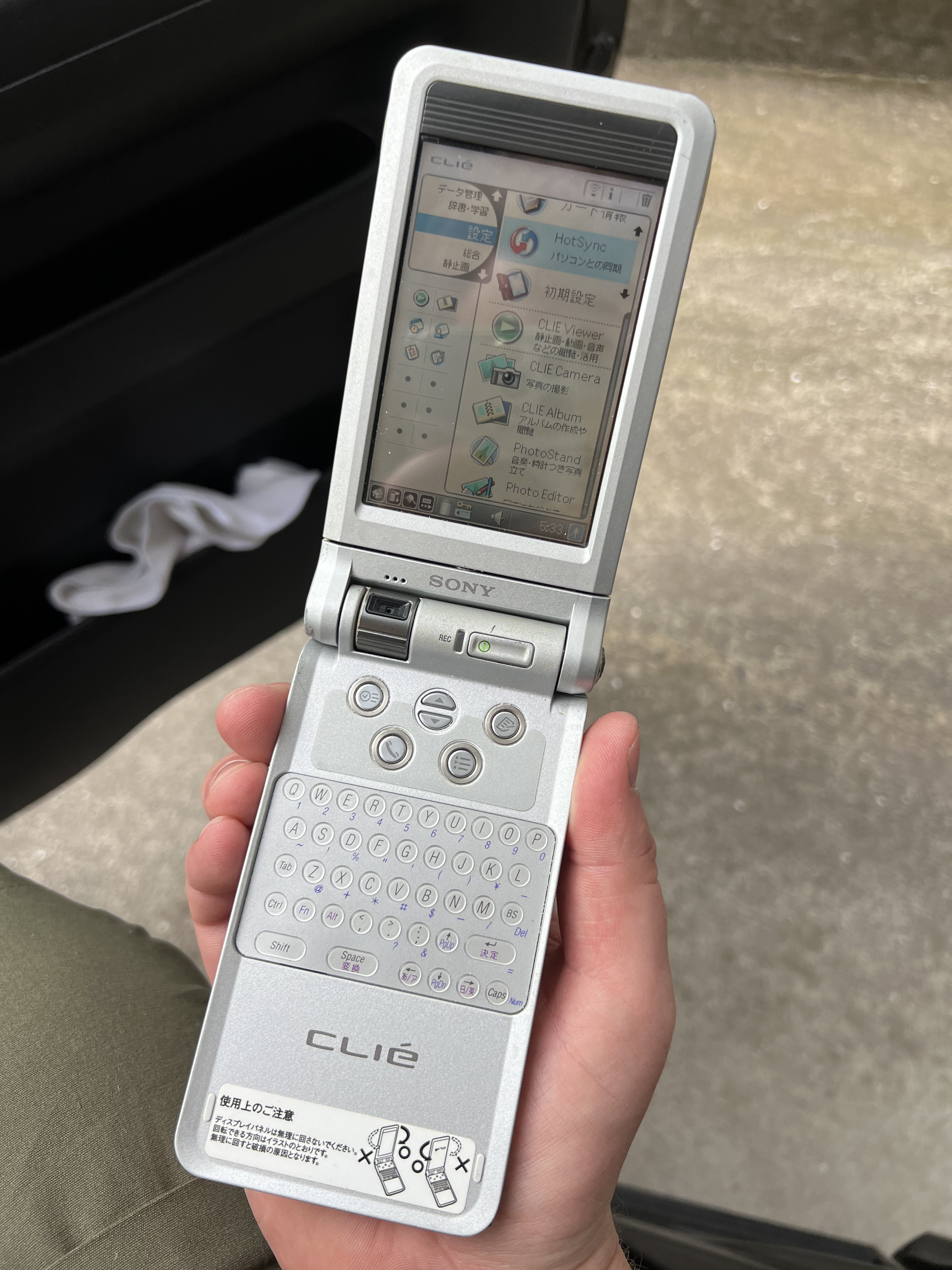
NX70V

The NX60 and NX70V were the first models in this series to be released, announced in October 2002. Notably, they were the 9th and 10th PDA models to be released by Sony that year. Being otherwise identical, the NX70 featured a VGA (0.3MP) digital camera built-in.

These models featured both Memory Stick and CompactFlash card expansion ports, but the CF slot was advertised as a "Wireless Communication Slot" and was only compatible with specific Sony wireless LAN cards, the PEGA-WL100 and PEGA-WL110. Third-party drivers were eventually available for these models that enabled support for CF memory storage as well.

==== Specifications ====
Specifications from Mobile Tech Review.

- Palm OS: 5.0
- CPU: Intel XScale PXA250 200 MHz
- Memory: 16MB RAM, 16MB ROM
- Display: 480 × 320, 16-bit Colour
- Sound: Internal audio amplifier and speaker, Headphone out.
- External Connectors: USB
- Expansion: Memory Stick Pro, Compact Flash (Type II), Wireless LAN (In form of Compact Flash expansion card sold separately by Sony)
- Wireless: Infrared
- Battery: Rechargeable Li-Ion
- Size & Weight: 5 1/2 (H) × 2 7/8 (W) × 15/16 (D) inches, 8 oz.
- Color: Silver

=== PEG-NX73V & PEG-NX80V ===
Announced in May 2003, the Clie PEG-NX73V and PEG-NX80V are similar to the previous models, but with some minor cosmetic changes. The functionality of the Compact Flash port was expanded, and now CF cards were supported for file storage as well. On the NX80 the storage was upgraded to 32MB, and the camera bumped up to a 1.3MP CCD, while the NX73 remained at 16MB and 0.3MP respectively.

==== Specifications ====
Specifications from CNET.

- Palm OS: 5.0
- CPU: Intel XScale PXA263 ARM CPU at 200 MHz
- Memory: 16 MB RAM (NX73)/32MB (NX80), 11 MB/27 MB available to user and 5 MB reserved for system use
- Display: 480 × 320, 16-bit Color
- Sound: Internal audio amplifier and speaker, built-in microphone, Headphone out (with connector for audio player remote control widget).
- External Connectors: USB
- Expansion: Memory Stick Pro, CompactFlash (Type II), Wireless LAN
- Wireless: Infrared (Bluetooth for European models)
- Battery: Rechargeable lithium-ion polymer
- Size: 2.9 in × 0.9 in × 5.3 in
- Weight: 8 oz
- Color: Metal Grey
- Camera: VGA 0.3MP (NX73)/1.3MP CCD (NX80), 160 × 112 for movies
- Keyboard: miniature QWERTY keyboard

== Accessories ==
Several accessories were produced for the NX series:

=== Game Controller ===
One of the accessories of note for the NX series, was a plug-in game controller, the PEGA-GC10.

=== Wireless LAN card ===
Sony produced two wireless expansion cards for these models, to provide internet access, the PEGA-WL100, and the PEGA-WL110. Both cards supported 802.11b. However, they suffered from a curious Palm OS 5.0 limitation of only being able to transfer files up to 1MB in size.

== See also ==
Sony CLIÉ NZ Series: The NZ series succeeds the NX series.
