= Palm IIIc =

Type of Palm PDA

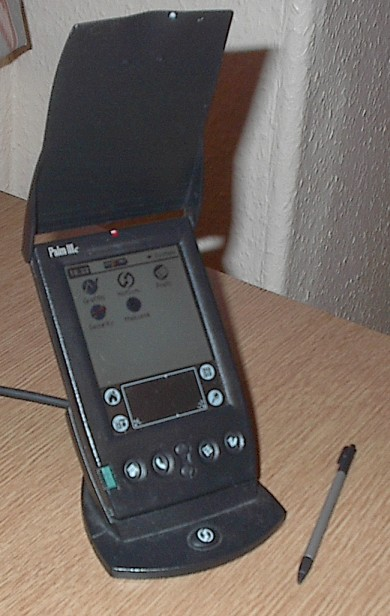
A Palm IIIc in its cradle.

The Palm IIIc is the first color PDA made by Palm, Inc., released in February 2000 for $449USD. It runs Palm OS 3.5, the first Palm OS version to have native color support and supported paletted 8-bit color modes. Using the Palm OS Upgrade Install CD, the Palm IIIc can be updated to Palm OS 4.1. The machine has a TFT LCD that is bright indoors. The Palm IIIc features the classic III-series connector, 8MB of RAM and a 20MHz DragonBall EZI CPU. The unit also has a lithium ion rechargeable battery and a slightly modified version of the original Palm III chassis.

== See also ==
- List of Palm OS Devices
