= HandEra =

Former manufacturer of personal digital assistant devices

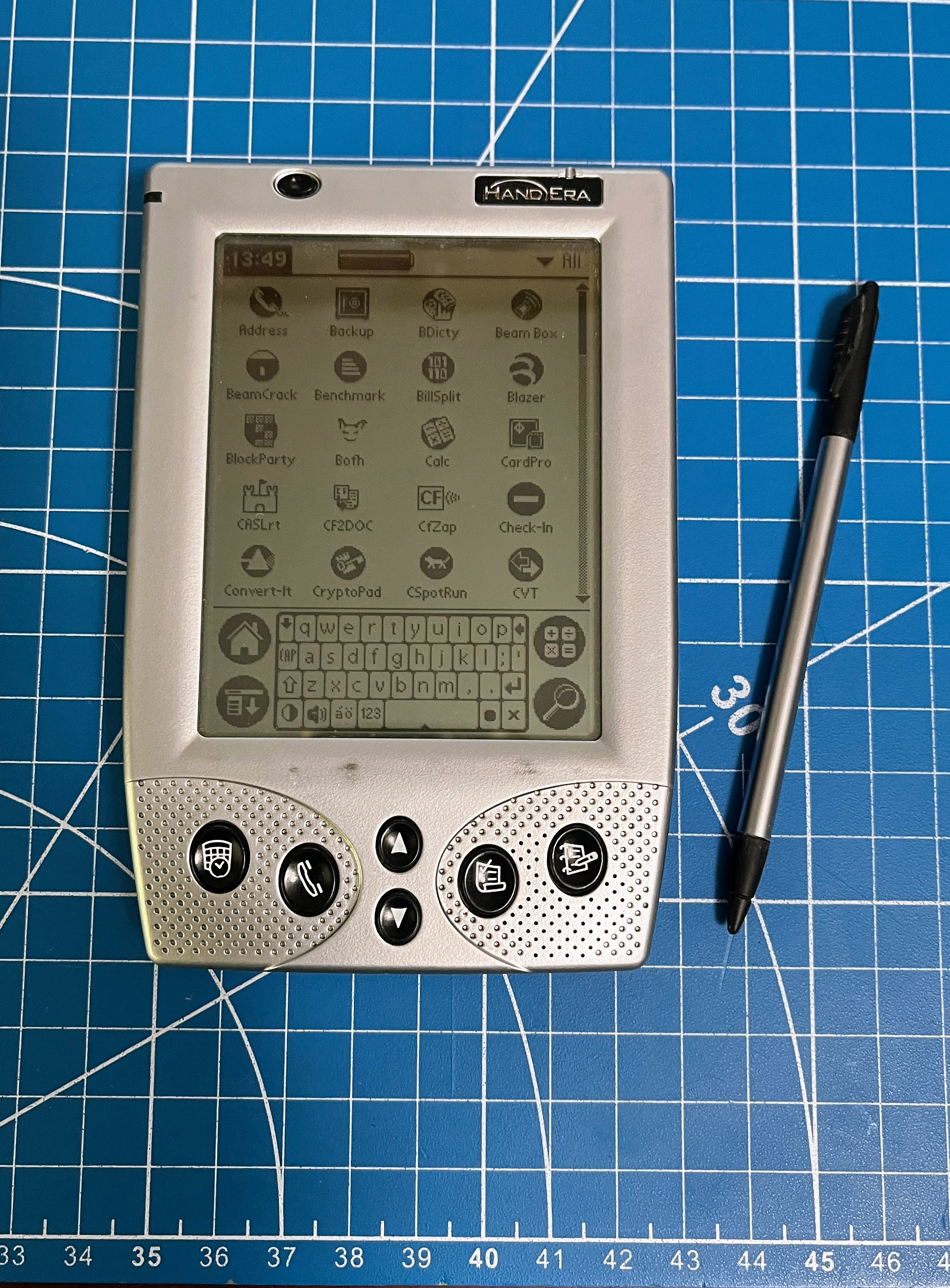
Handera 330

HandEra (formally TRG) was a manufacturer, software developer, and service contractor. HandEra's business previously revolved around Palm OS, and devices running Palm OS. The company's headquarters were in Des Moines, Iowa.

== Products ==
=== TRGpro ===
At the time of their first handheld launch, the company name was TRG, an acronym for Technology Resource Group. TRG's first handheld was the TRGpro, which launched at US$329. The TRGpro was made to compete with Palm, Inc.'s Palm III Series. The TRGpro ran Palm OS 3.3, and provided a competitive edge over the Palm III with a built-in loudspeaker, a faster processor, as well as a Compact Flash slot for expansion. The CF card slot supported both memory expansion cards, as well as I/O accessories such as modems, network and barcode scanner cards. The TRGpro is powered by AAA batteries.

=== Handera 330 ===
HandEra's second handheld was the Handera 330. The 330 introduced many new features which were not standard for other Palm OS devices at their time, and launched in April 2001 at US$349.

==== Dynamic Silk-Screen Area ====
The most significant innovation with the Handera 330 was the incorporation of a dynamic silk-screen area, and the Handera was the first Palm OS device to provide virtual graffiti input. On all other Palm OS devices of the time, the text input 'Graffiti' area was located within a dedicated silk-screened area. However, on the Handera 330, the LCD region extended across the full touchable area, with the text input area instead being dynamically displayed, and could be minimised to provide greater screen area for use in supporting applications. This also enabled the ability to display a touch keyboard in the same text-input area. The 330 also offered a 1.5x higher density LCD screen, featuring a QVGA (240x320) LCD resolution, which was both an increase and a deviation from the standard 160x160 screens used on most other Palm OS devices of the time.

As the 330 was also the only Palm OS device at the time to feature a QVGA screen resolution, Handera provided a free SDK to enable apps to support these features, but explicit support by the developer was required to take advantage of the higher resolution and full-screen capabilities. For all other apps lacking explicit support, the system enables the user to choose to run programs in either a 1:1 reduced size mode, or with a 1.5 software zoom. The SDK also enabled developers to offer screen rotation in their programs.

In addition the 330 also featured a jog wheel (following Sony's use on the CLIE), a microphone, an internal audio amplifier, an MMC / SD slot, and a Compact Flash Type II slot. The 330 also supported various add-ons such as a Wi-Fi Card.

The 330 supports dual power options, offering the choice of either using four AAA batteries, or an optionally purchased Li-ion battery pack. Since most similar Palm OS devices used only two AAA batteries, this enabled a significant improvement in battery life of 4–6 weeks, unless consumed by the additional hardware expansion capabilities.

==== Software ====
The device shipped with Palm OS 3.5, but a few beta versions of Palm OS 4.1 update were posted online around 2005. Official updates to Palm OS 4.1 never happened due to a contract dispute with PalmSource.

The 330 was also bundled with a number of software packages, including QuickOffice (for Word/Excel compatible files), CardPro, Backup, and Chapura Pocket Mirror (syncs with Outlook).

The built-in backup utility allows users to backup or restore RAM contents from an inserted memory card. Multiple backup files could be maintained on a single card.

==== Reception ====
The Handera 330 was broadly highly praised for its numerous significant innovations, but was also not without criticism. The larger screen was praised for its greater size, higher text fidelity, and excellent clarity, but the flexibility promised by the dynamic silk-screen area was hampered by limited developer adoption, and was also critiqued for having a slow response rate. By contrast, Sony's CLIE devices of the time offered an even higher 320x320 resolution, which offered a perfect 2x scaling, making backwards compatibility far easier to implement than with the Handera's strange 1.5x scaling. The incorporation of extra slots and extra batteries also made the device significantly thicker and heavier than other models from Palm, like the m505 series, or the Handspring Visor Edge which both offered svelt form factors that retained expandability and extensibility. It was said that the device "forgoes sex appeal in favour of significant and useful innovations" and that it was "bulky and chunky". The painted chrome silver finish on the plastic housing was also criticised for both appearing cheap and lacking in durability. As a package, the device was assessed as "a strong enterprise PDA", thanks to the included features and software bundled. Finally, while the use of the standard Palm III connector made compatibility with other accessories easy, the Handera 330 was let down by only featuring slow serial-based synchronisation, rather than offering USB support like the Handspring Visor.

=== Handera 330c ===
HandEra's third handheld was the Handera 330c. It was exactly the same as the 330, except with a full 16-bit-colour screen and running Palm OS 4.1. This device never shipped, but leaked prototypes have been seen in the wild. The device never shipped due to a contract dispute with PalmSource over Palm OS 4.1 licensing fees.

=== Services ===
While no longer producing handhelds, HandEra still provides their services. Their current services include Palm OS Development, OMAP Technology, Hardware Design, Software Design, EMC Testing, Mechanical Design, and individual projects.

== Specifications ==
=== TRGpro ===
- CPU: Motorola DragonBall-EZ MC68EZ328 operating at 16 MHz
- Memory: 8MB
- Display: 160x160 FSTN LCD, 16 Gray Scale
- Sound: Internal audio amplifier and speaker
- External Connectors: 1 RS232 serial port
- Expansion: Compact Flash
- Wireless: Infrared
- Battery: Two AAA Batteries
- Size & Weight: 4.7 x 3.2 x 0.8 in (121 x 82 x 20 mm), 6 oz. (170 g) including batteries
- Color: Black
- Casing: Plastic

=== HandEra 330 ===
- CPU: 33 MHz Motorola DragonBall-VZ
- Memory: 8MB
- Display: 240 x 320 QVGA, 16 Gray Scale
- Sound: Internal audio amplifier and speaker, Microphone
- External Connectors: 1 RS232 serial port
- Expansion: Compact Flash, SD/MMC
- Wireless: Infrared
- Battery: Four AAA Batteries, Optional Li-Ion Battery Pack
- Size & Weight: 4.7 x 3.2 x 0.7 in. (121 x 81 x 17 mm), 5.4 - 5.9oz
- Color: Silver
- Casing: Plastic
- Software: Quickoffice

=== HandEra 330c ===
- CPU: 33 MHz Motorola DragonBall-VZ
- Memory: 8MB RAM, 4MB flash (shared with OS)
- Display: 240 x 320 QVGA, 16-bit color, 3.8" diagonal
- Sound: Internal audio amplifier and speaker, Microphone
- External Connectors: 1 RS232 serial port, 1 USB port (muxed on cradle connector)
- Expansion: Compact Flash, SD/MMC
- Wireless: Infrared
- Battery: Internal Li-Ion Battery
- Color: Silver & Blue
- Casing: Plastic
