= I'm Watch =

Smart watch

i'm Watch
- Manufacturer: i'm S.p.A.
- Type: Smartwatch
- Weight: 2.9 oz (82 g)
- Operating system: Android 2.1
- Storage: 4 GB
- Battery: 450 mAh Lithium Polymer; Run time: 5-6 hours
- Display: 1.54-inch, 240x240px Color LCD Screen
- Connectivity: Bluetooth 2.1+ EDR and 4.0 and ANT+

The i'm Watch is a smartwatch developed by Italian company i'm S.p.A. It was conceptualized by Manuel Zanella and Massimiliano Bertolini in early 2011, with funding provided by H-Invest and then released in the middle of 2012. The i'm Watch can receive calls, texts and notifications from social media accounts, provide news and weather reports, control music, view and save photos, and create appointments. The watch can also be paired to iOS 4 or higher, Android 4 or higher and BlackBerry 10 devices. On September 19, 2014, i'm S.p.A. announced the discontinuation of sales and its exit from the smartwatch market.

== Features ==
Utilizing a touchscreen, the i'm Watch features a 1.54-inch, color LCD screen. Sensors for the watch include an accelerometer and a magnetometer. In terms of operating system, it has its own customized version of Android 1.6 called i'm Droid 2. It also has a built-in microphone and speaker, as well as 4GB of memory space. It uses Bluetooth 2 for connectivity. For charging, a USB proprietary cable is attached to the headphone jack.
The i'm Watch is available in four watch case materials: aluminum, gold, silver and titanium. It has six wristband color options: black, pink, red, blue, white and yellow.

=== Other specifics ===
- 450 MHz processor ARM 9
- i.MX233 Applications Processor
- Lithium Polymer 450 mAh battery
- 128 MB of RAM

== Reception ==
Critics have considered the i'm Watch as a flop. CNET praises the device for its smooth interface and how it displays notifications and messages in an easily viewable format. The downside to this though, is that the watch is very difficult to set up. Battery life is very low, as it falls way short of other devices on the market. Laptop Magazine liked the internal memory capacity, but feels that the Bluetooth tethering causes too much hassle when connecting. They added that the watch looks like "a timepiece from the future, but its performance does not match the Dick Tracy-style feature set." Tech Radar commends the i'm Watch for its ability to pair with Android, iOS and BlackBerry devices, but is concerned about the poor hands-free control quality and lack of text message alerts.

== See also ==
- Wearable computer
- MetaWatch
- Pebble Watch
