= Palm IIIx =

Personal digital assistant from 1999

- Website: palm.com at the Wayback Machine (archived 2000-03-01)

The Palm IIIx is a PDA from Palm Computing released in 1999 briefly before the scaled down Palm IIIe was introduced into the marketplace.

The Palm IIIx improved upon the Palm III by featuring a new enhanced and easier to read LCD and 4 MB RAM, as opposed to the 2 MB in the Palm III. The Palm IIIx also had a 16 MHz Motorola DragonBall EZ CPU that is faster, along with claims to be more efficient, than the 16 MHz Motorola DragonBall CPU found in all previous Palm models.

The Palm IIIx featured a new inverse electroluminescent backlight that illuminated the screen text instead of the screen background. This new feature was an area of controversy, as many people disliked the feature, while many found it to be an improvement. The Palm IIIx shipped with Palm OS 3.1, which included many fixes over the previous version of Palm OS, 3.0.

The Palm IIIx also featured an expansion slot inside of its casing. This slot could accommodate a 3rd party upgrade card, and expand the Palm IIIx's functionality or storage ability.

This model suffered from a design defect in its CPU, wherein the date would often fail to change at midnight, especially when the batteries were fresh.

OS Upgrade - The last Palm OS that can be downloaded off the www.palm.com website is 3.3, however the last OS for the IIIx is 4.1, which had to be bought at the time it came out on CD (now the CDs are discontinued and a bit hard to find).

== See also ==
- List of Palm OS Devices
