= Palm m100 series =

Lower-cost series of Palm PDAs

Palm m125 Handheld Computer, 2001

m125, with cover, top, button

The Palm m100 series consists of four Palm OS based personal digital assistants (or PDAs) titled m100, m105, m125, and m130. These models were intended to be "entry-level" PDAs, and therefore their cases were built from cheaper materials. Most notably, the covers of the LCD screens and the digitizers were plastic rather than glass, and the screens were smaller than the more expensive Palm devices on sale at the time.

Unlike some other Palm computers, which had rechargeable batteries, they were designed to run on standard AAA batteries (except for the m130, which uses a rechargeable battery). During battery changes, data was preserved via a capacitor.

A hinged flip screen cover with a screen window was an included accessory. When the device is not in use, the "scroll up" button can be depressed through a hole in the cover to briefly display the system clock in the cover's window.

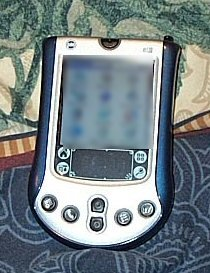
The Palm m130 was the first Palm in the m100 series with a color screen

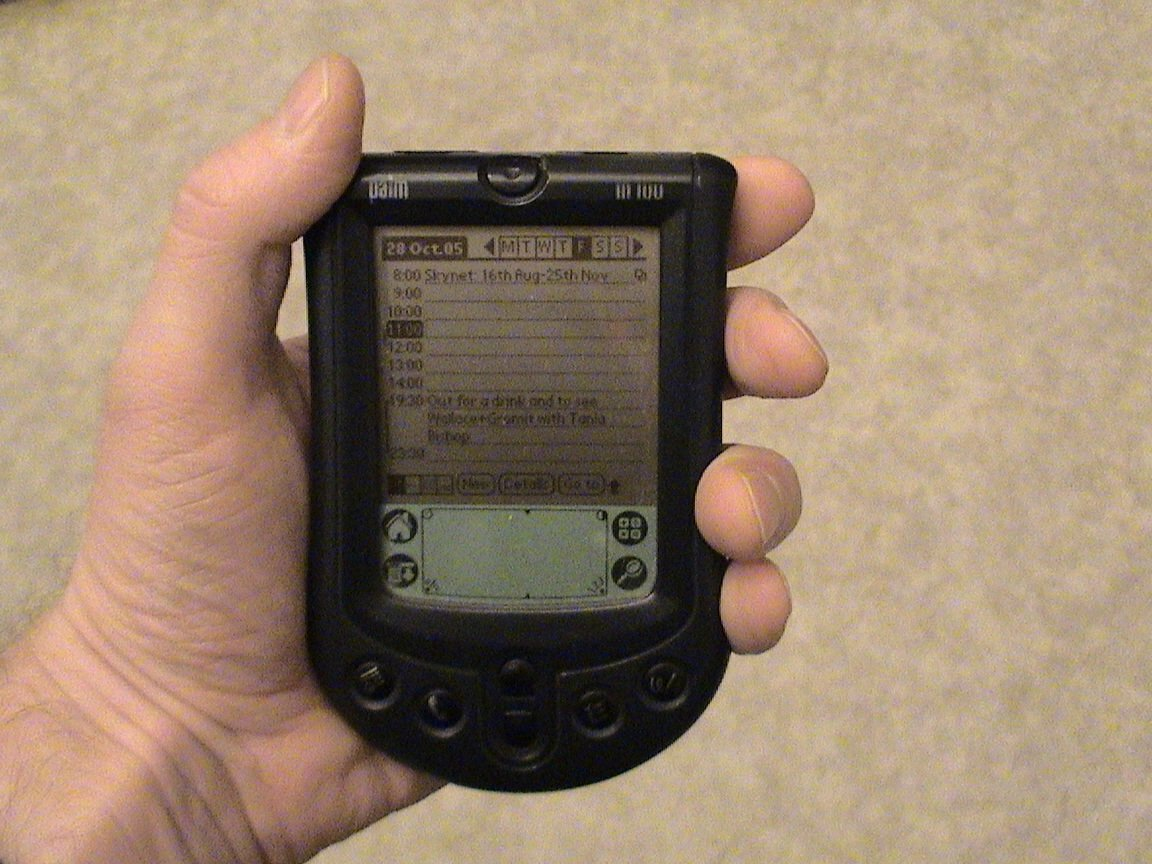
The grayscale Palm m100

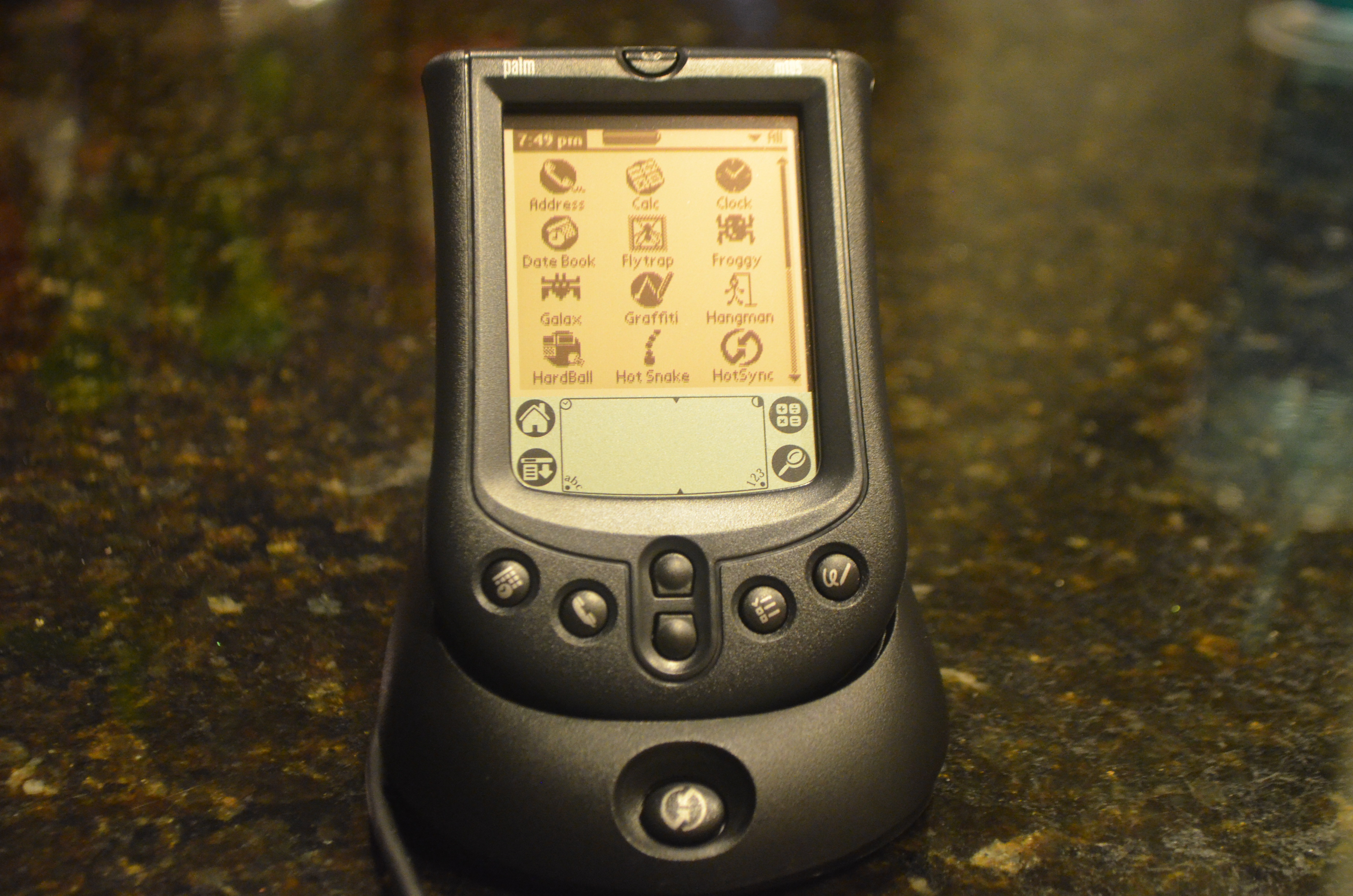
A Palm m105 sitting in its HotSync cradle.

== Specifications ==
The m100 is powered by the Motorola EZ Dragonball processor operating at 16 MHz and has 2 Megabytes of RAM. It was released in August 2000, and originally shipped to customers with Palm OS 3.5. It is 4.66 inches high, 3.10 inches wide, and 0.72 inches thick. It weighs 3.7 oz without batteries or the screen cover. It came with a serial cable to sync with a computer and a CD-ROM with Palm Desktop software. It has a durable plastic screen that will withstand falls better than glass screens, and it comes with a hinged screen cover that hangs over the screen when not in use.

The m105 is identical to the m100 but it contains 8 Megabytes of RAM, and in the box a cradle is included instead of a cable. It was released on March 6, 2001, and originally shipped to customers with Palm OS 3.5. The m105 had a problem whereby the capacitor that saved the contents of the RAM when changing batteries would fail. Several hardware hacks are available that fix this error.

The m125 is powered by the Motorola VZ Dragonball processor operating at 33 MHz. It has a 160x160 pixel greyscale LCD screen and 8 Megabytes of RAM. It was released in September 2001, and originally shipped to customers with Palm OS 4.0.1. The cradle connection and addition of an expansion port differs from that of the earlier models, and is identical to that of the Palm m500 series, and this model shipped with a synchronization cradle that connected to the USB port (M100 and M105 connected via the PC's serial port.) This handheld also features an expansion slot for an SD or MMC format memory card, in addition to SDIO cards. The Palm m125 is the last PDA manufactured by Palm that accepts user-replaceable AAA batteries.

The m130 is also powered by the Motorola VZ Dragonball processor operating at 33 MHz. It has a 160x160 pixel LCD screen that supports 12-bit color. It was released on March 4, 2002, and was originally shipped to customers running Palm OS 4.1.

== Novel Uses ==
An emulated m130 is still used to control the projection system in some IMAX theaters, while many still use real hardware to control the film's video and audio synchronization.
