= Sony CLIÉ PEG-N760C =

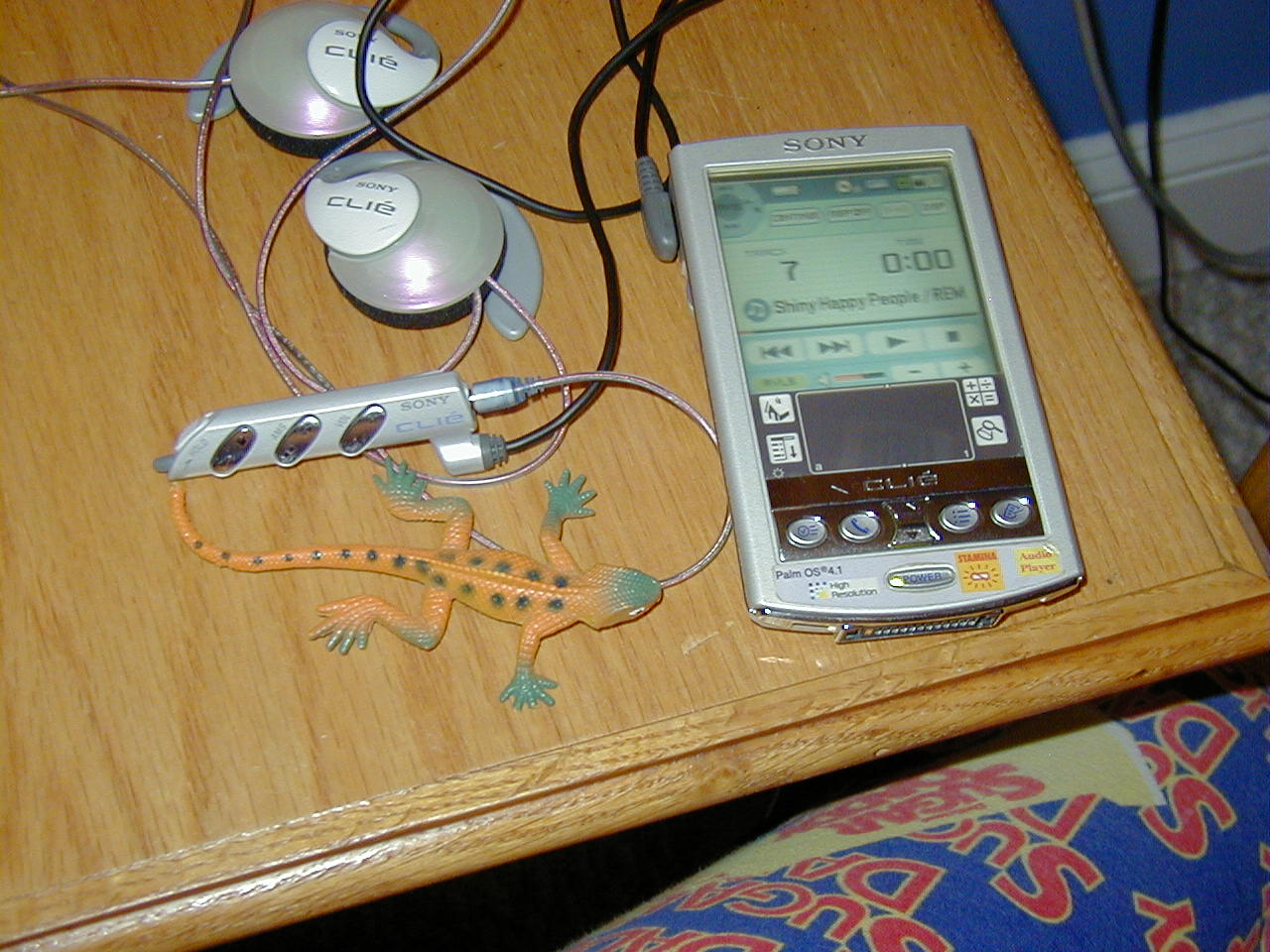
The CLIÉ N760C with its included headphones and the Audio Player program.

The Clie PEG-N760C is a Personal Digital Assistant (PDA) made by Sony. The PEG-N760C ran Palm OS, and was one of the first Palm OS devices to have a High-Res Color Screen and a built in MP3 Player.

== Specifications ==
- Palm OS: 4.1
- CPU: 33 MHz Dragonball VZ
- Memory: 8MB, 8MB Memory Stick included
- Display: 320 x 320, 16bit Color
- Sound: Internal audio amplifier and speaker, Headphone out.
- External Connectors: USB
- Expansion: Memory Stick
- Wireless: Infrared
- Battery: Rechargeable Li-Ion
- Size & Weight: 2.88 (L) x 4.75 (W) x 0.69 (H) inches, 5.65 oz.
- Color: Silver

== Weaknesses ==
- Memorystick with magic gate came later. MS Pro only had up to 128mb (or had a double sided 128 as the maximum size available to store data.
- Small volume slider controls had a tendency to break.
