= Sony CLIÉ TJ Series =

Personal digital assistant product line

The Sony Clie TJ series were mid-range personal digital assistants produced by Sony, running the Palm operating system (version 5).

== PEG-TJ35 & PEG-TJ25 ==
The Sony CLIÉ PEG-TJ35 and PEG-TJ25 were released by Sony in 2003. These models are identical, except the TJ-35 also offers MP3 and ATRAC playback capabilities with a headphone jack. Powered by an ARM iMX-1 processor at 200 MHz, these devices ran the Palm OS 5 platform, featuring 32 MB of internal storage (23M available for user data), as well as a Memory Stick PRO slot for additional storage expansion. Synchronization via USB and Infrared is also possible. The case of these devices appears to be aluminium, but is actually a painted plastic enclosure, with an internal steel plate providing structural rigidity. At the time of release, these devices competed with the PalmOne Zire 71. While navigation on these devices could be performed using the touchscreen, as was common for many Clie models, these devices also featured a scrolling wheel offering easy one-handed vertical navigation, which could be pressed in to select items.

Sony PEG-TJ35
- Manufacturer: Sony
- Type: PDA
- Lifespan: October 2003
- Media: 32 MB internal Flash memory
- Operating system: Palm OS 5.2.1 on Flash ROM
- CPU: 200 MHz Motorola MX-1
- Display: HiRes 16-bit color 320x320 3.1 in. TFT touchscreen display
- Sound: Headphone out, internal speaker (mono)
- Input: Touchscreen, miniature QWERTY keyboard, jog dial
- Touchpad: Entire screen
- Connectivity: Infrared (IrDA 1.2), USB, Memory Stick PRO
- Power: Lithium-ion battery(800 mA / 5.2 V) / AC 120/230 V
- Dimensions: 76mm x 110mm x 12mm / 3in x 0.5in x 4.4in
- Weight: 100.3g/4.9 oz

=== Included Software ===
The device comes with a few applications:

==== In ROM ====
- Address Book
- AeroPlayer (Version 1.0S) - A MP3 player.
- Calculator
- Calendar
- CLIÉ Files
- CLIÉ Image Viewer (Version 1.2)
- CLIÉ Launcher
- CLIÉ Memo
- Data Export (Version 1.0)
- Date Book
- Decuma handwriting recognition
- Graffiti 2 handwriting system
- HotSync
- Memo Pad
- Note Pad
- Pixel Viewer. An application to view Microsoft Word, Excel and PowerPoint documents, or PDF and HTML files.
- Preferences
- To Do List

A bundle of trial software versions are also available on Installation CD-ROM.

==== Installation CD-ROM ====
===== PC =====
- Palm Desktop v.4.1
- Adobe Acrobat
- Image Converter
- Intellisync Lite for syncing to Outlook.
- QuickTime

===== Palm =====
- Agendus (Trial)
- BDicty (Trial)
- London Tube Guide (Trial)
- Paris Metro Guide (Trial)
- Kickoo's Breakout (Trial)
- Kickoo's TakTik (Trial)
- Bump Attack Pinball (Trial)
- ViaMichelin (Trial)

=== Multimedia ===
==== Music ====
MP3s can be played from Memory Stick/Memory Stick PRO using the skinable AeroPlayer. Files must be stored in /PALM/Programs/MSAUDIO directory on the Memory Stick. MP3s with bit rates from 96 kbit/s - 320 kbit/s will be played.

Additional codecs to support Speex or Vorbis were available for free.

==== Video ====
TCPMP could be used to watch Videos on this device. The files can only be played from Memory Stick/Memory Stick PRO.

== PEG-TJ37 & PEG-TJ27 ==
The Sony CLIÉ PEG-TJ37 and PEG-TJ27 were released in early 2004, and improved upon the previous models with the addition of an integrated digital camera, complete with dedicated shutter button, and a manual sliding lens cover. The camera featured VGA (640x480, 0.31MP) resolution, and was only capable of taking still photographs. Like the previous models, the higher-end TJ37 also included MP3 playback capabilities, but now also added Wi-Fi for mobile internet access. Most other features and specifications remained the same as per the previous generation.

PEG-TJ37
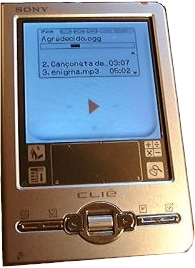
- Manufacturer: Sony
- Type: PDA
- Lifespan: February 2004
- Media: 32 MB RAM (Approx. 23 MB available), 16 MB ROM, expandable with Sony MemoryStick flash storage.
- Operating system: Palm OS 5.2.1
- CPU: 200 MHz MX-1 ARM
- Display: 320x320 TFT screen capable of displaying 65,536 colors
- Input: Touchscreen
- Camera: .31 megapixel CMOS VGA
- Touchpad: Entire screen
- Connectivity: Wi-Fi (Broadcom BCM4317)
- Power: Battery
