= DragonBall (microcontroller) =

Microprocessor design released in 1995

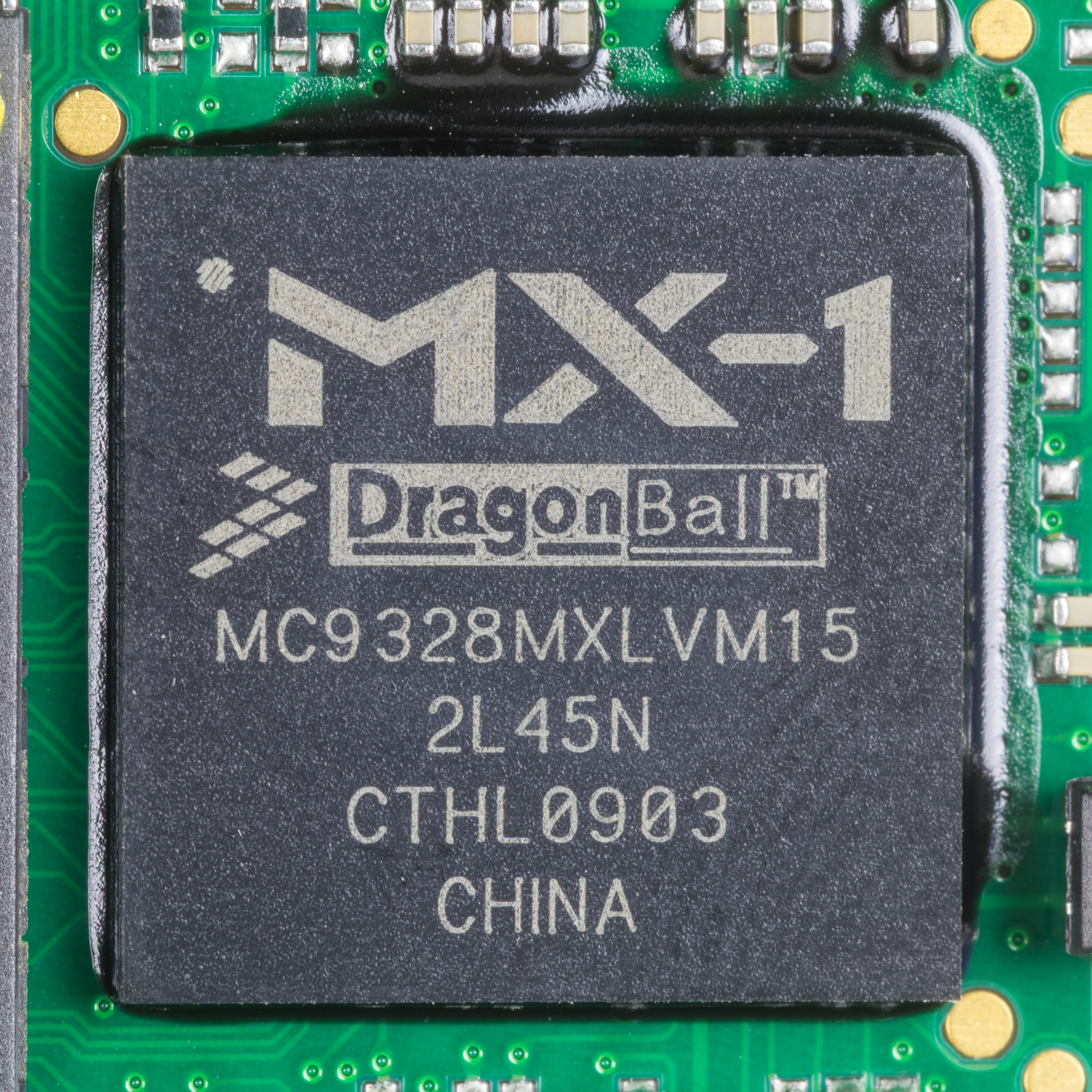
- Motorola DragonBall MX-1 Microprocessor
- Manufacturer: Motorola; Freescale
- Product family: Motorola 68000 series
- Type: CPU
- Released: 1995
- Power: 3.3v
- Website: motorola.com at the Wayback Machine (archived 2000-02-29)

The DragonBall, or MC68328, is a microcontroller design based on the 68000 core, but implemented as an all-in-one 3.3v low-power system for handheld computer use. It is supported by μClinux. It was designed by Motorola in Hong Kong and released in 1995. The series was later owned by Freescale Semiconductor. Its title originates from the manga of the same name.

The DragonBall's major design win was in numerous devices running the Palm OS platform. However, from Palm OS 5 onwards their use was superseded by ARM-based processors from Texas Instruments and Intel.

The processor is capable of speeds of up to 16.58 MHz and can run up to 2.7 MIPS (million instructions per second), for the base 68328 and DragonBall EZ (MC68EZ328) model. It was extended to 33 MHz, 5.4 MIPS for the DragonBall VZ (MC68VZ328) model, and 66 MHz, 10.8 MIPS for the DragonBall Super VZ (MC68SZ328).

It is a 32-bit processor with 32-bit internal and external address bus (24-bit external address bus for EZ and VZ variants) and 32-bit data bus (8/16-bit external data bus). It has many built-in functions, like a color and grayscale display controller, PC speaker sound, serial port with UART and IRDA support, UART bootstrap, real time clock, is able to directly access DRAM, Flash ROM, mask ROM, and has built-in support for touch screens.

The more recent DragonBall MX series microcontrollers, later renamed the Freescale i.MX (MC9328MX/MCIMX) series, are intended for similar application to the earlier DragonBall devices but are based on an ARM processor core instead of a 68000 core.
