= CLIÉ =

Personal digital assistant

Sony CLIÉ

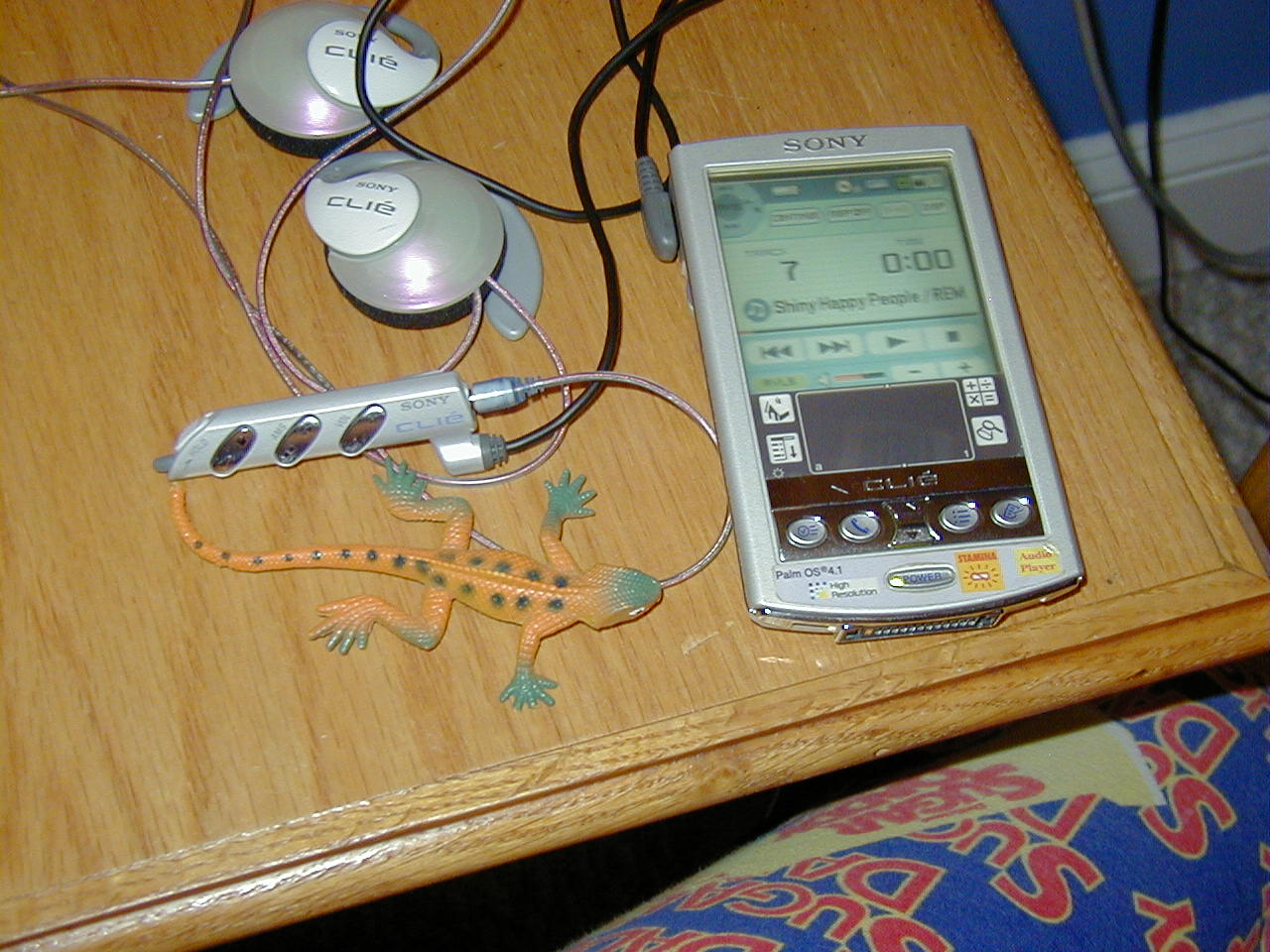
- The CLIÉ N760C Audio with its included headphones and the Audio Player program.
- Manufacturer: Sony
- Type: Personal digital assistant
- Release date: 2000; 26 years ago
- Lifespan: 2000–2005
- Discontinued: 2005; 21 years ago
- Operating system: Palm OS
- CPU: Dragonball, ARM

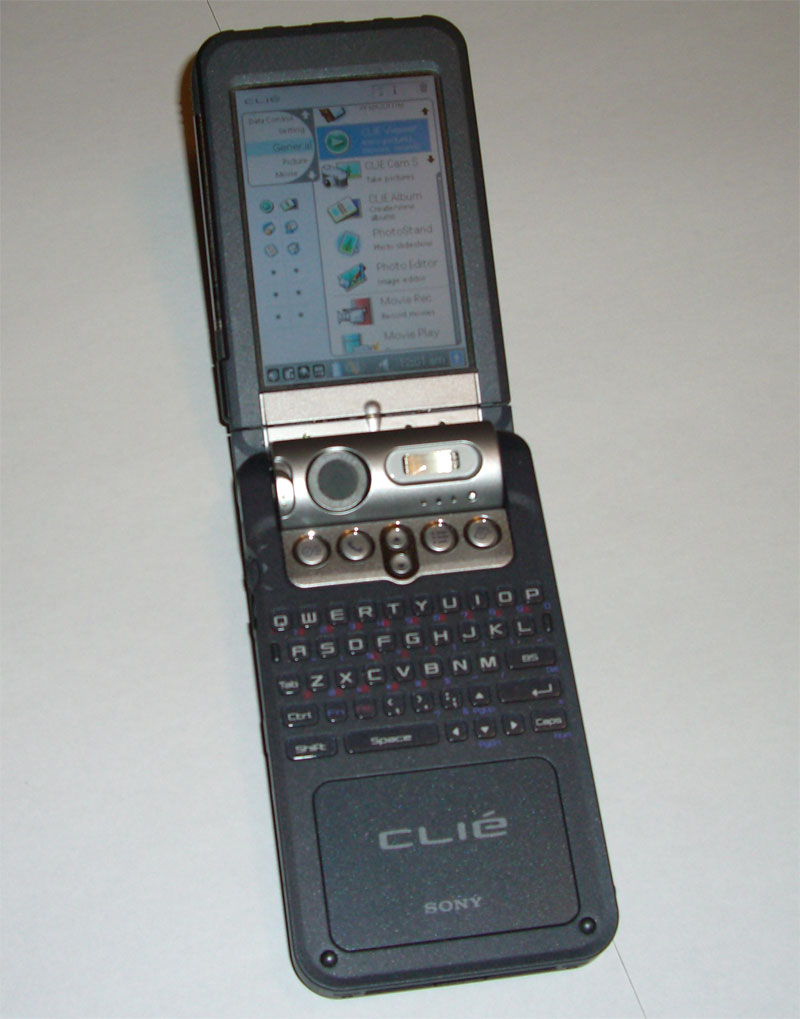
A Sony CLIÉ PEG-NZ90 Personal Entertainment Organiser model featuring a respectable multimedia specification.

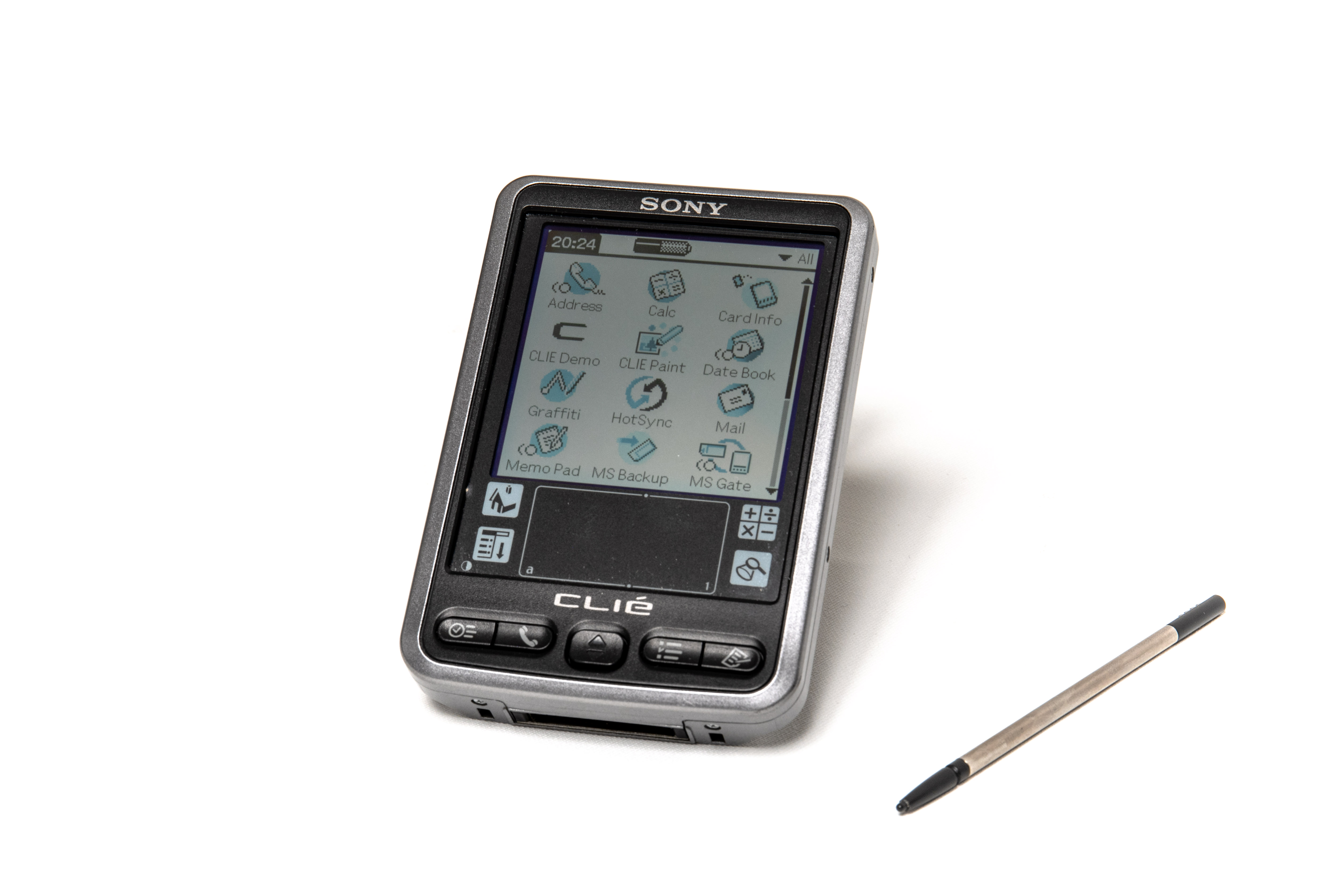
Sony CLIÉ PEG-SL10

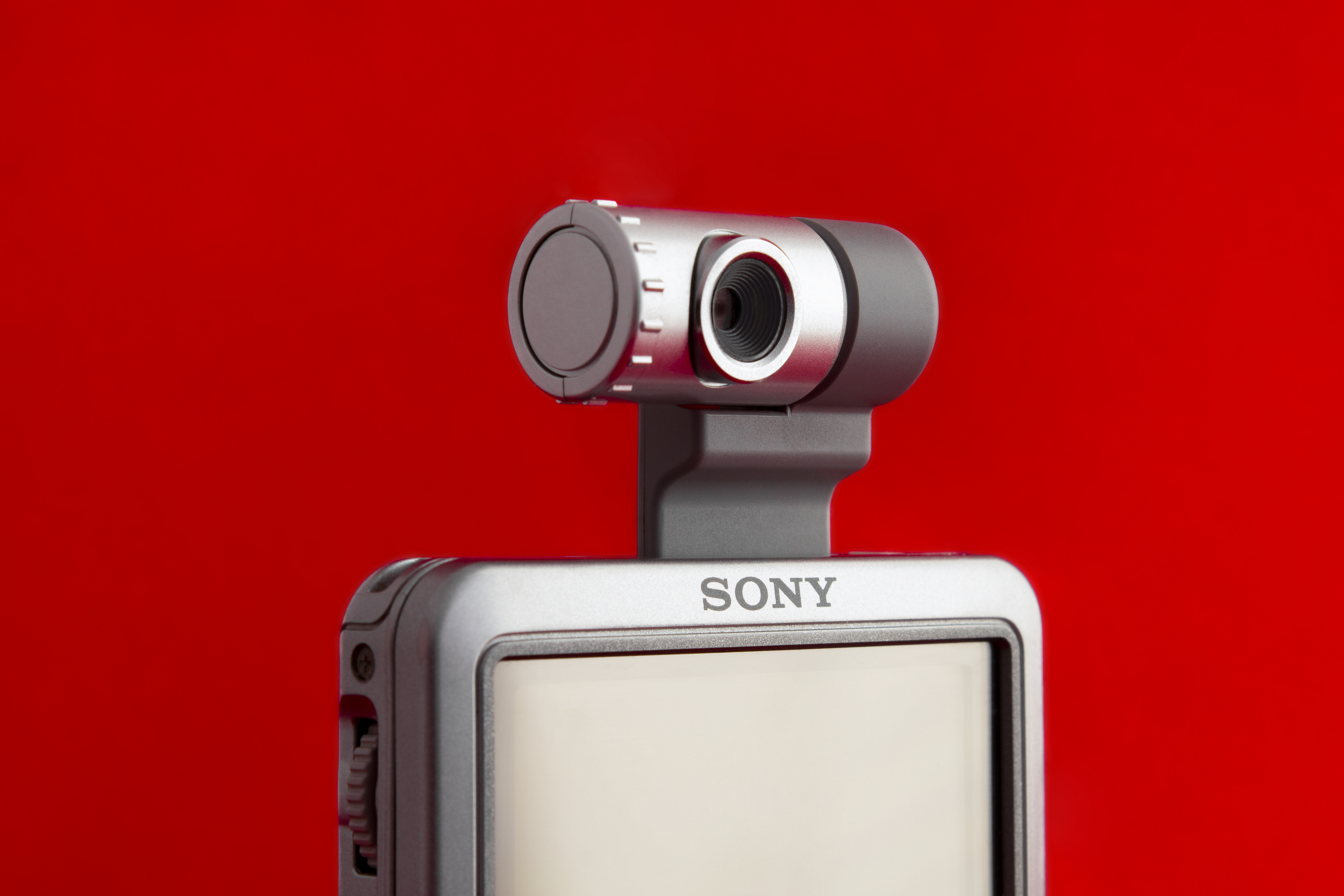
Sony PEGA-MSC1 digital camera connected to the Clié PEG-SJ20

CLIÉ is a series of personal digital assistants (PDAs) running the operating system (OS) Palm OS, developed and marketed by Sony from 2000 to 2005. The devices introduced many new features to the PDA market, such as a jog dial (or jog wheel) interface, high-resolution displays, and Sony technologies like Memory Stick slots and ATRAC3 audio playback. Most models were designed and manufactured in Japan.

The CLIÉ handhelds were distinguished from other Palm OS models by their emphasis on multimedia abilities, including photo, video, and audio playback, long before any other Palm OS PDAs had such abilities. Later models have been credited with spurring competition in the previously stagnant Palm market, closing many of the gaps that existed between Palm OS PDAs and those using Microsoft Windows Mobile OS, more so for multimedia, but also with Sony's proprietary application launcher interface.

== Name ==
CLIÉ stands for: creativity, lifestyle, innovation, emotion, and formerly communication, link, information and entertainment. The name was initially an attempt at a new coinage term, though it means tool in the Jèrriais language.

== Closure of handheld line ==
In the summer of 2004, Sony announced that new CLIÉs would, from then on, be manufactured and available only in Japan, and in the spring of 2005, Sony announced the end of its CLIÉ line of products. The last models to be released worldwide were the PEG-TJ27, PEG-TJ37, and PEG-TH55. The last model released in Japan was the PEG-VZ90. Soon after the closure of the CLIÉ line, Sony stopped providing original installation drivers, including Sony's version of Palm Desktop for the CLIÉ, which are necessary for Hotsyncing with the PC and otherwise taking advantage of the handhelds' many features for which a PC may be needed. Several CLIÉ fans took it upon themselves to offer these drivers freely for download at www.sonyclie.org.

== Models ==
CLIÉ handhelds were released in series, usually with a few models released in each series. In later years, multiple series would be in production at the same time.

=== Motorola Dragonball CPU: Palm OS 3.5, 4.x ===
- S series (2000–2002)
- T series (2001–2003)
- N series (2001–2002)
- NR series (2002)
- SL/SJ series (2002–2003)

=== ARM compatible CPU: Palm OS 5.0, 5.2 ===
- NX series (2002–2004)
- NZ series (2003–2004)
- TG series (2003–2004)
- UX series (2003–2004)
- TJ series (2003–2004)
- TH series (2004)
- VZ series (2004–2005) (Japan only)

== Macintosh support ==
Officially, the CLIÉ line did not support the Macintosh, and Sony never provided any software with the handhelds for Macintosh operating systems. However, as a Palm OS device, every CLIÉ handheld was inherently capable of HotSync operations with a Mac OS computer. This allowed for synchronizing the basic personal information manager (PIM) functions, and for installing new software, though this ability was unusable because the Mac HotSync software would not recognize the handheld. PalmSource, however, silently added the ability to recognize older CLIÉ devices when providing new versions of its Palm Desktop software for Mac. This was necessary for those who could synchronize only via USB.

The CLIÉ user community soon discovered that these "updates" were simply a matter of adding a few lines to the USB-detection property-list file. Since then, detailed instructions have been posted online for those who want to synchronize their CLIÉ handhelds. No modifications are required for Bluetooth synchronizing, but Wi-Fi synchronizing is impossible because the Mac OS HotSync software does not support network synchronizing. Some workarounds for the multimedia features also exist. For those who desire stronger Mac OS/CLIÉ integration, the product Missing Sync made by the company Mark/Space is also available. This does make unencrypted Wi-Fi synchronizing possible but a bug in the CLIÉ network stack reverses IP addresses which means that the Macintosh involved needs a palindromic IP address such as 10.0.0.10.

== See also ==
- List of Palm OS devices § Sony CLIÉ
- Graffiti (Palm OS)
- Palm OS
- PalmSource, Inc.
- Personal digital assistant
- Walkman
- Mylo (Sony)
- Sony Xperia
- Sony Magic Link
