= Sony Handheld Engine =

PDA processor

The Sony Handheld Engine (or Sony HHE) was an ARM-based Application Processor, or SoC announced by Sony in July 2003. This mobile processor was specifically developed for the Sony CLIE series of PDAs, and was cutting-edge for the time, with a heavy focus on power-efficiency, and featuring numerous state-of-the-art features integrated into a single Application Processor IC.

The Sony Handheld Engine processor (model CXD2230GA) was first used on the Sony CLIÉ UX Series. This processor was also used on some subsequent CLIÉ models, specifically the TH55 and on the VZ90.

This processor was advertised as having additional mobile capabilities, such as dynamic speed scaling for power efficiency, hardware acceleration for MPEG video playback, a DSP for audio processing, a 2D graphics accelerator, as well as integrated camera, MemoryStick, and LCD interfaces. This highly integrated combination of capabilities were not found in other mobile CPU's until several years later. The processor offered DVFM (Dynamic Voltage and Frequency Management), combining both dynamic clock speed and dynamic voltage scaling power saving features together, and this was advertised as being the world's first commercial implementation of such a feature. This processor also featured a 123 MHz ARM926 core with 64 Mbit of integrated eDRAM, and was produced on a 180 nm lithography process by Sony Computer Entertainment in their Nagasaki Chip Fab.

== Devices featuring the Sony HHE ==
- Sony CLIÉ UX Series
- Sony CLIÉ PEG-VZ90
- Sony CLIÉ PEG-TH55

== See also ==
- XScale
