= Sony CLIÉ PEG-TG50 =

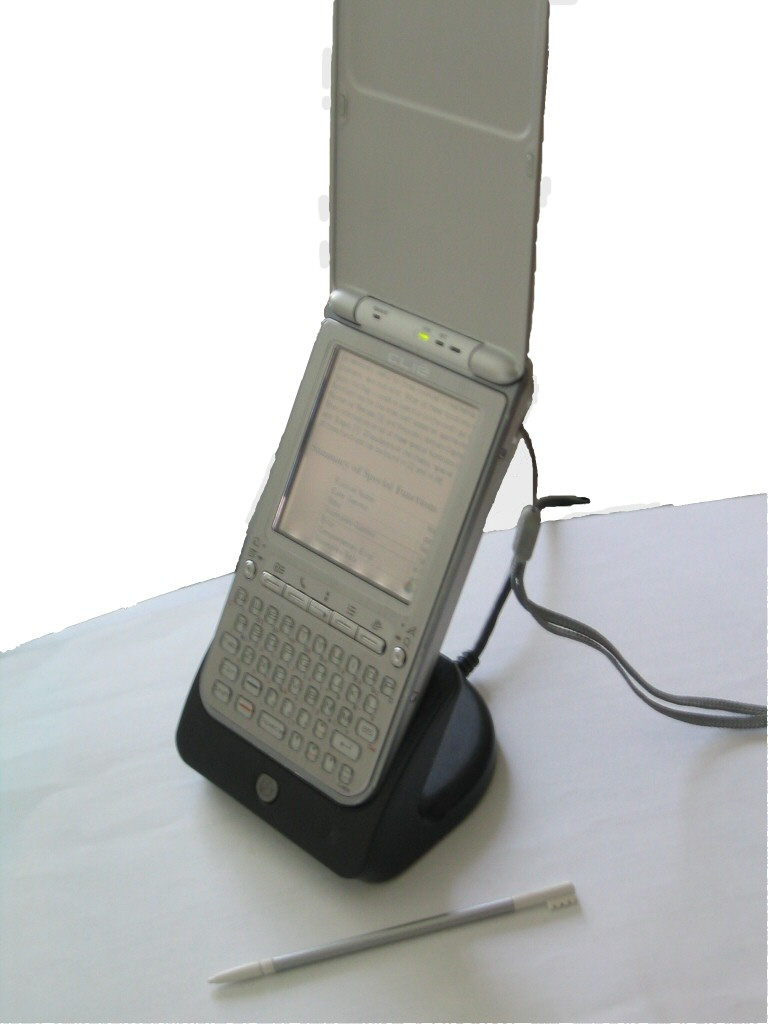
Sony CLIÉ PEG-TG50

The Clié PEG-TG50 is a Personal Digital Assistant (PDA) which was manufactured by Sony, released in March 2003. Running the Palm operating system (version 5.0), the TG50 was notable as it featured a built-in backlit mini qwerty keyboard, in lieu of a dedicated handwriting recognition area as was the trend on most other PDAs.

This handheld featured a 320x320 colour LCD, Bluetooth, and additional multimedia features, including MP3 and ATRAC3 audio playback, a voice-recorder, and a slot for MemoryStick PRO memory cards. The TG50 was powered by a 200 MHz Intel XScale PXA250 processor, with 16MB of RAM, 11MB of which was available for user data storage. The TG50 also featured the "Jog Dial" scroll wheel on the side of the device, as was common on Sony CLIÉ models, and came with a flip cover to protect the front face of the device when not in use.

== Specifications ==
- Palm OS: 5.0
- CPU: Intel XScale PXA250 200 MHz
- Audio codec: AK4534VN
- PMIC: Panasonic AN32502A
- Touch controller: Analog Devices AD7873
- Gate array / IO expander: NEC 65943-L63
- Memory: 16MB RAM (11MB avail.), 16MB ROM
- Display: 320x 320 transflective back-lit TFT-LCD, 16bit Colour (65k colours)
- Sound: Internal audio amplifier, Rear speaker, Mono Mic, Stereo Headphone out.
- External Connectors: USB
- Expansion: Memory Stick Pro, MSIO
- Wireless: Infrared IrDA, Bluetooth
- Battery: Rechargeable Li-Ion Polymer (900mAh)
- Size & Weight: 5.0" x 2.8" x 0.63"; 6.2 oz.
- Color: Silver

== See also ==
Sony CLIÉ TH Series - The successor to the TG series.
