= Memory stick =

Memory Stick is a proprietary removable flash memory card format created by Sony.

Memory stick may also be used informally to refer to:

- Memory cards in general; electronic flash memory data storage devices used for storing data, typically in portable devices
- USB flash drive (or "thumb drive", "pen drive", etc.), a removable flash memory based data storage device with an integrated USB interface
- DIMM (dual in-line memory module), a module containing random access memory (RAM) mounted on a printed circuit board for installation into a computer
