= Sony CLIÉ PEG-VZ90 =

The Clie PEG-VZ90 is a Personal Digital Assistant (PDA) made by Sony. It ran the Palm OS (version 5) and was the last of the CLIÉ line. The PEG-VZ90 was released in 2004, only in Japan, and was made in the form of a Mini Tablet PC. It was the first handheld to have an OLED display.

== Specifications ==
- Palm OS: 5.2.1
- CPU: Sony Handheld Engine CPU at 123 MHz
- Memory: 64 MB RAM (40 MB available to user) and 128 MB internal Flash (95 MB available to user)
- Display: 480 × 320, 16bit Color OLED Display
- Sound: Internal audio amplifier and speaker, Headphone out.
- External Connectors: USB
- Expansion: Memory Stick Pro
- Wireless: Infrared, Wi-Fi
- Battery: Rechargeable Li-Ion
- Size & Weight: 270 g
- Color: Silver, Black
