= T-Mobile Sidekick =

Smartphones produced by Danger and T-Mobile

Danger Hiptop/T-Mobile Sidekick

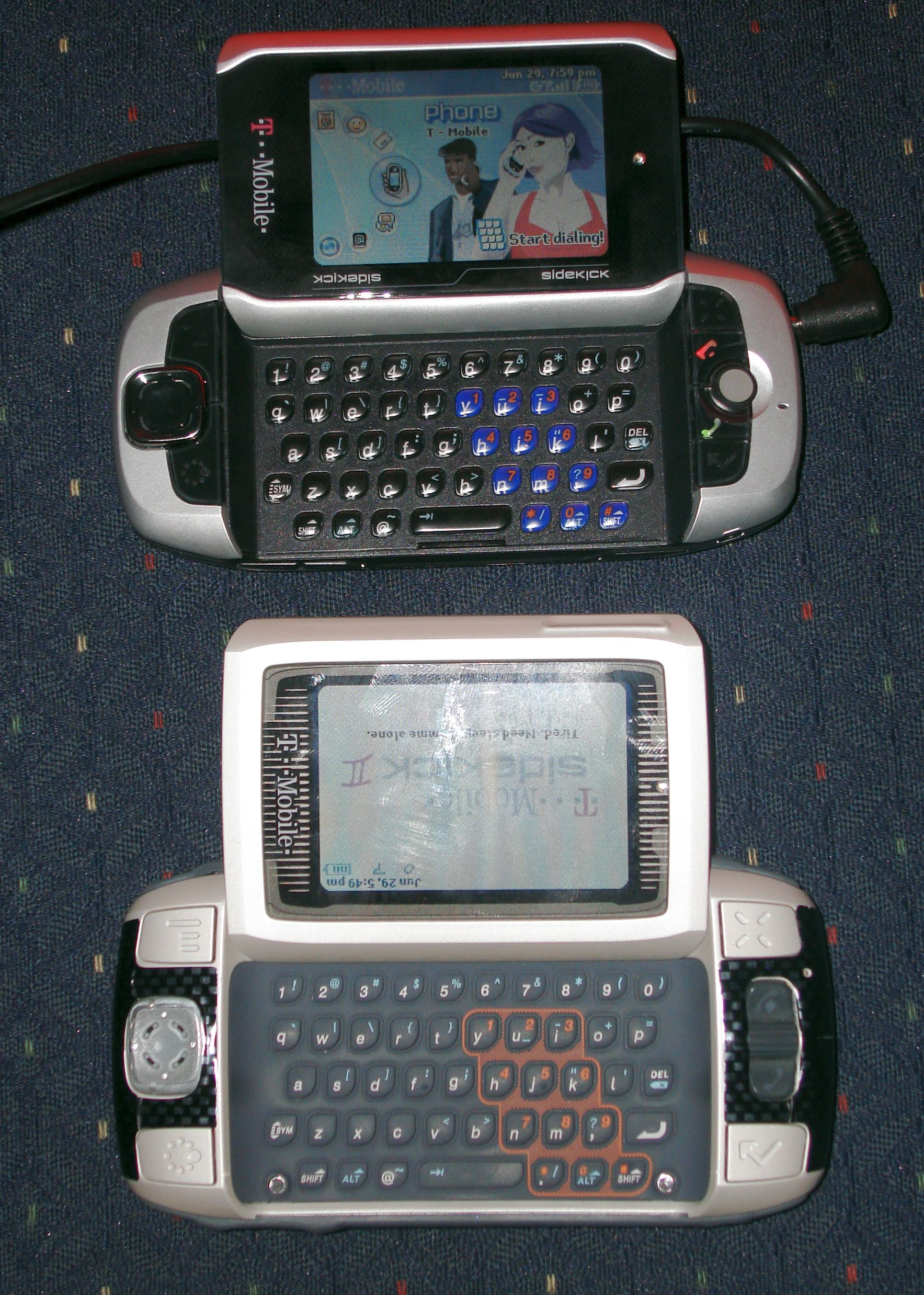
- A Sidekick II (lower) and its successor Sidekick 3 (upper)
- Brand: Danger Inc.; T-Mobile
- Manufacturers: Danger Incorporated; Flextronics; Sharp Corporation; Motorola
- Type: Smartphone; Internet communicator
- First released: 2002
- Discontinued: July 2, 2010
- Successor: Microsoft Kin; T-Mobile Sidekick 4G
- Compatible networks: GPRS, EDGE, UMTS, 3G
- Form factor: Swivel
- Operating system: Danger OS; NetBSD

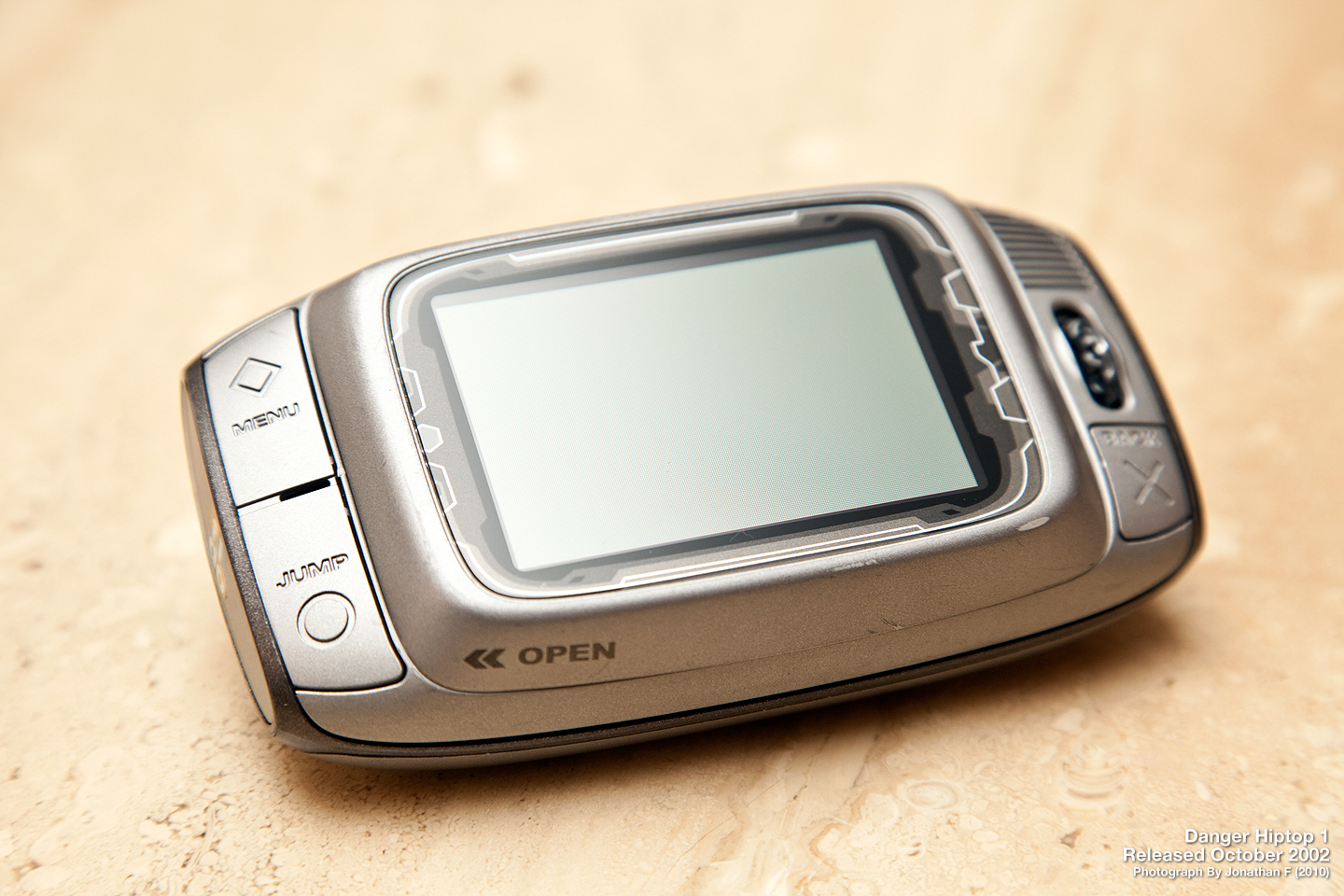
The original Hiptop while closed, showing the Menu and Jump buttons on the left exterior

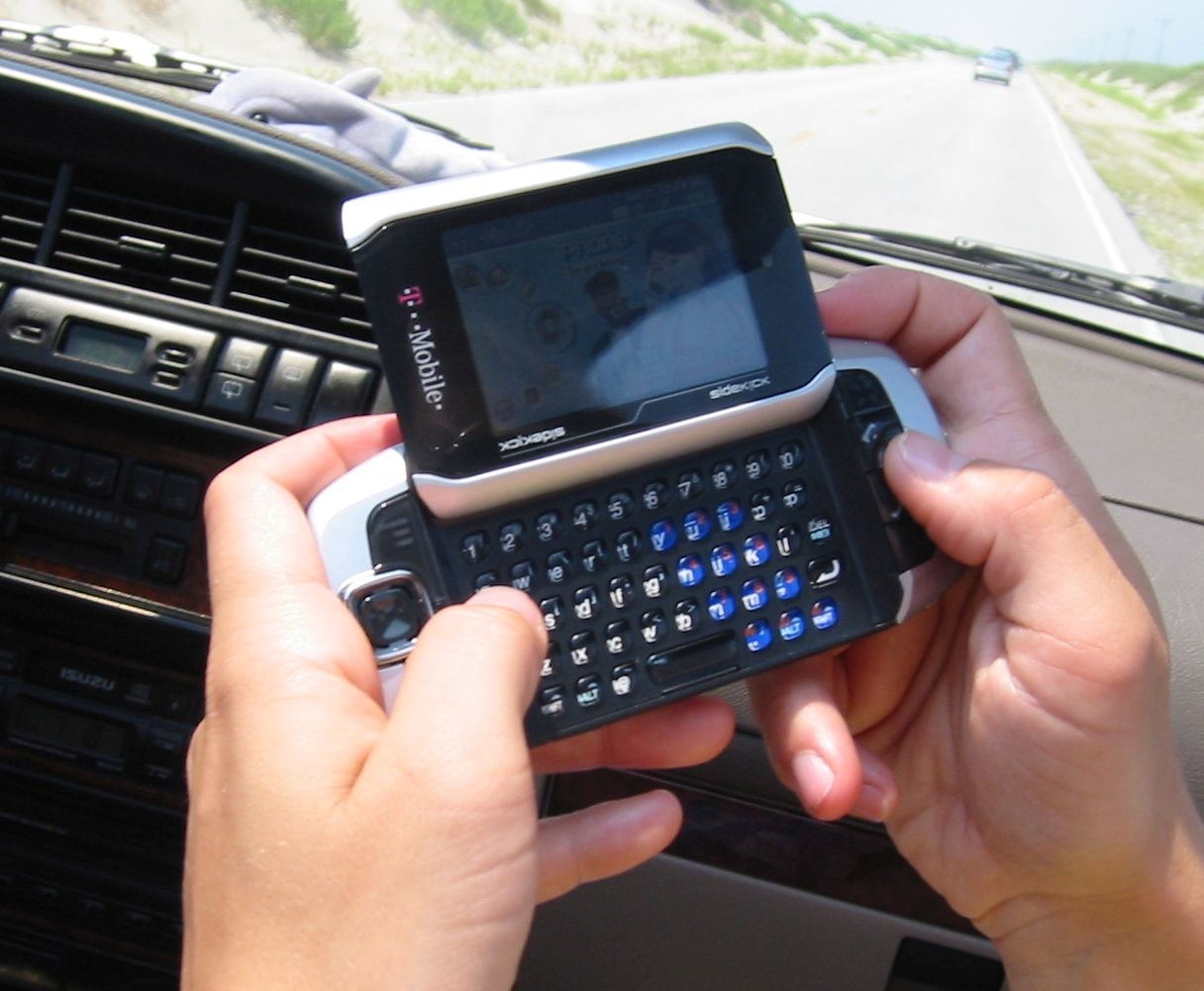
The Hiptops were designed to be held with both hands in landscape. Shown here: T-Mobile Sidekick 3.

The Danger Hiptop (stylized hiptop), also branded and sold as T-Mobile Sidekick, is a mobile smartphone and communicator series that was produced by Danger, Inc. from 2002 to 2010, developed in close partnership with T-Mobile US and with most models manufactured by Sharp Corporation. The Hiptops were designed to be held horizontally with both hands, allowing typing with two thumbs on a QWERTY keyboard that is revealed by a 'flip out' display rotating 180 degrees on a hinge pin (with the exception of one model, Hiptop Slide). They ran on a cloud-based, Java-made software synchronizing with back-end services provided and maintained by Danger, holding personal data and offering services such as email, instant messaging, and a catalog of downloadable apps.

Danger, Inc. was cofounded by Andy Rubin, who would become the author of Android. The original Hiptop was released on October 1, 2002, manufactured by Flextronics. Described at the time as a "PDA phone", it was notable for combining a cell phone with a full HTML-supporting web browser, integrated AOL Instant Messenger, a keyboard and a navigation scroll wheel, running on the GSM and GPRS cell network of T-Mobile. The second generation Hiptop/Sidekick debuted in 2004, manufactured by Sharp, with a slimmer design and the addition of a VGA camera. This was followed by the third generation in 2006 which replaced the scroll wheel with a trackball and added a music player, Bluetooth, and faster EDGE data. The line diversified in 2007 with the Sidekick iD, billed as a budget-friendly model with cut features, as well as the Sidekick Slide, a model manufactured by Motorola and with a slide design instead of a swiveling screen. The fourth generation top model was the Sidekick LX, increasing the display size to 3.0 inches, and this was followed by the Sidekick 2008 and the final model, Sidekick LX 2009, with numerous hardware upgrades including 3G connectivity and social networking software integration—this one was later also sold as the Mobiflip or the Sharp Jump, with modified software and not using Danger's data services.

The Hiptop/Sidekick became popular especially among young consumers, unlike similar devices during its early years, namely Palm and BlackBerry, which found more business success. Danger, Inc. was purchased by Microsoft for $500 million in 2008, who used the technology to build the ill-fated Microsoft Kin. Danger's cloud services were shut down on May 31, 2011, ending the Hiptop/Sidekick data services after almost nine years in operation. The Sidekick was revived later that year with the Sidekick 4G running Android 2.2 Froyo, manufactured by Samsung, using a similar form factor to the originals but without a swivel. The Sidekick achieved iconic popularity in the U.S., at its peak receiving much attention in American pop culture Some models were also marketed, to lesser success, in Canada (by Fido/Rogers), Australia (by Telstra), Singapore and a number of European countries.

== Typical features ==
The Sidekick included a backlit monochrome display; the screen could be swiveled to cover the QWERTY keyboard. It also featured a clickable scroll wheel and blinking lights.

== Model releases ==
=== hiptop/T-Mobile Sidekick (Flextronics) ===
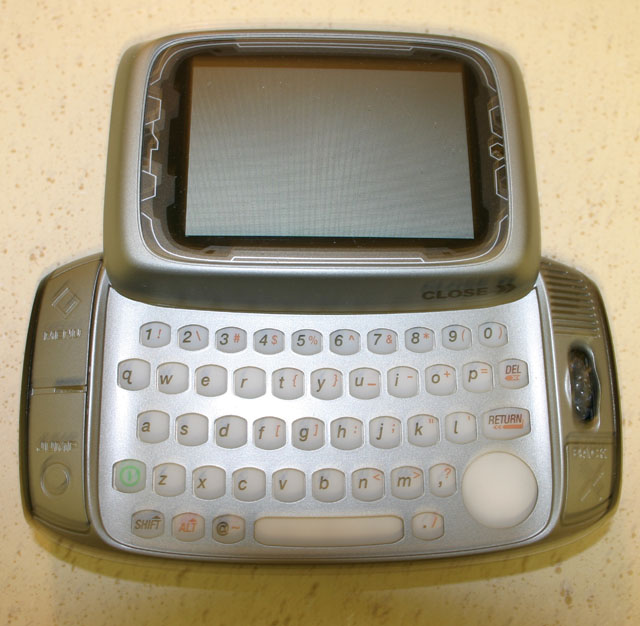
T-Mobile Color Sidekick

The original Hiptop was made official on September 6, 2001, and was released on October 1, 2002, sold by T-Mobile in the United States, initial price was $200 and then $40 per month. A later revision of the Hiptop upgraded its screen from a monochrome LCD to a 65,000 color LCD. This version was released on June 6, 2003 by T-Mobile for a price of $299.99.

From the beginning, Hiptops have featured "Menu", "Back", "Jump" and other keys accessible even when the unit was closed. The Hiptop also featured a speaker which is used for device sounds but not telephone. Along the top edge of the phone bezel is an infrared transceiver. Although Danger stated that the infrared port would come to use in the future for data transmission (i.e. IrDA), this never occurred and the port remained without purpose, and was not included at all in future Sidekicks. The headset jack serves a dual purpose, as it is also used for an optional accessory camera.

SunCom and Edge Wireless used to sell the device in some parts of the United States. Fido was the exclusive Hiptop carrier in Canada and released it in August 2003. In Germany, the Hiptop service was also offered from 2003 by E-Plus which included a flat rate tariff. The Hiptop was also sold in Singapore by Starhub in 2004.

=== hiptop^{2}/T-Mobile Sidekick II (Sharp) ===
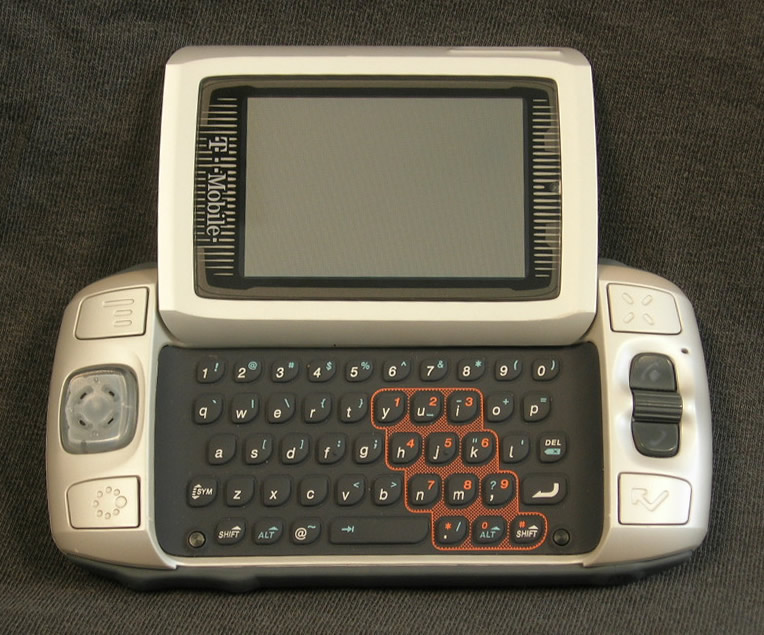
T-Mobile Sidekick II

Announced on August 9, 2004, and released on September 22, 2004 by T-Mobile US, the Hiptop 2 (stylized hiptop^{2}) was the first to be manufactured by Sharp. Compared to the first generation, the new model moved the D-Pad (directional-pad), previously found on the inside, to the left hand side of the device, while shoulder dials, volume and power buttons were on the outside edges. The Hiptop2 also features an integrated VGA camera and a speakerphone at the rear of the unit. Also was the addition of page-up/page-down buttons on the top and bottom of its scroll wheel.

In Canada, the Danger Hiptop2 launched on March 8, 2005. The Hiptop2 launched in Germany on March 10, 2005. It was later launched in Austria in October 2005 and Great Britain in November 2005. On October 9, 2006, the Australian Hiptop2 was released through Telstra. The Australian version is practically the same as the Sidekick II in the U.S. but re-constructed for the Australian audience—it has MSN Messenger built-in as the default messenger and Yahoo! Messenger which is downloadable from the catalog (the US version has Yahoo and AOL Instant Messenger).

==== Limited edition ====
There are also two limited edition variants of the T-Mobile USA Sidekick II: Juicy Couture Edition (Pink) and Mister Cartoon Edition (Black). These are different case colors with the same hardware and operating systems.

=== hiptop^{3}/T-Mobile Sidekick 3 (Sharp) ===
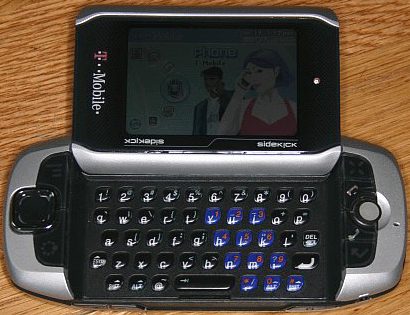
T-Mobile Sidekick 3

Announced in June 2006 and released July 10, 2006 in the US, with a later release in Europe, the Hiptop 3 (stylized hiptop^{3}) manufactured by Sharp was 20% physically smaller than its predecessor. The industrial design was changed as well as a new color scheme to a dark gray shell with silver trim and gloss black buttons. The scroll wheel was replaced by a multicolor LED-lit six-direction trackball replacing the D-pad as the indicator light. The keyboard was also changed to a rigid plastic keyboard differing from the rubber keyboard of previous models known to peel away from the unit.

All software features, including the line-by-line scroll feature were retained from the previous model. Software remained basically the same, but with the addition of more applications. This included MP3 playback software, allowing the playback of MP3, WAV and AAC format audio files from the built-in storage. A Bluetooth module was also added as well as an upgrade of the cellular modem to support faster EDGE data speeds.

Other new features include a removable 3.7v 1500 mAh battery, a miniSD slot capable of up to 2 GB of flash memory storage, and a 1.3-megapixel camera (an improvement from the sub-megapixel VGA 640 x 480 camera). The MiniUSB functionality was changed from allowing access to the Hiptop's internal communications to only allowing access to the MiniSD card over a USB v1.1 port.

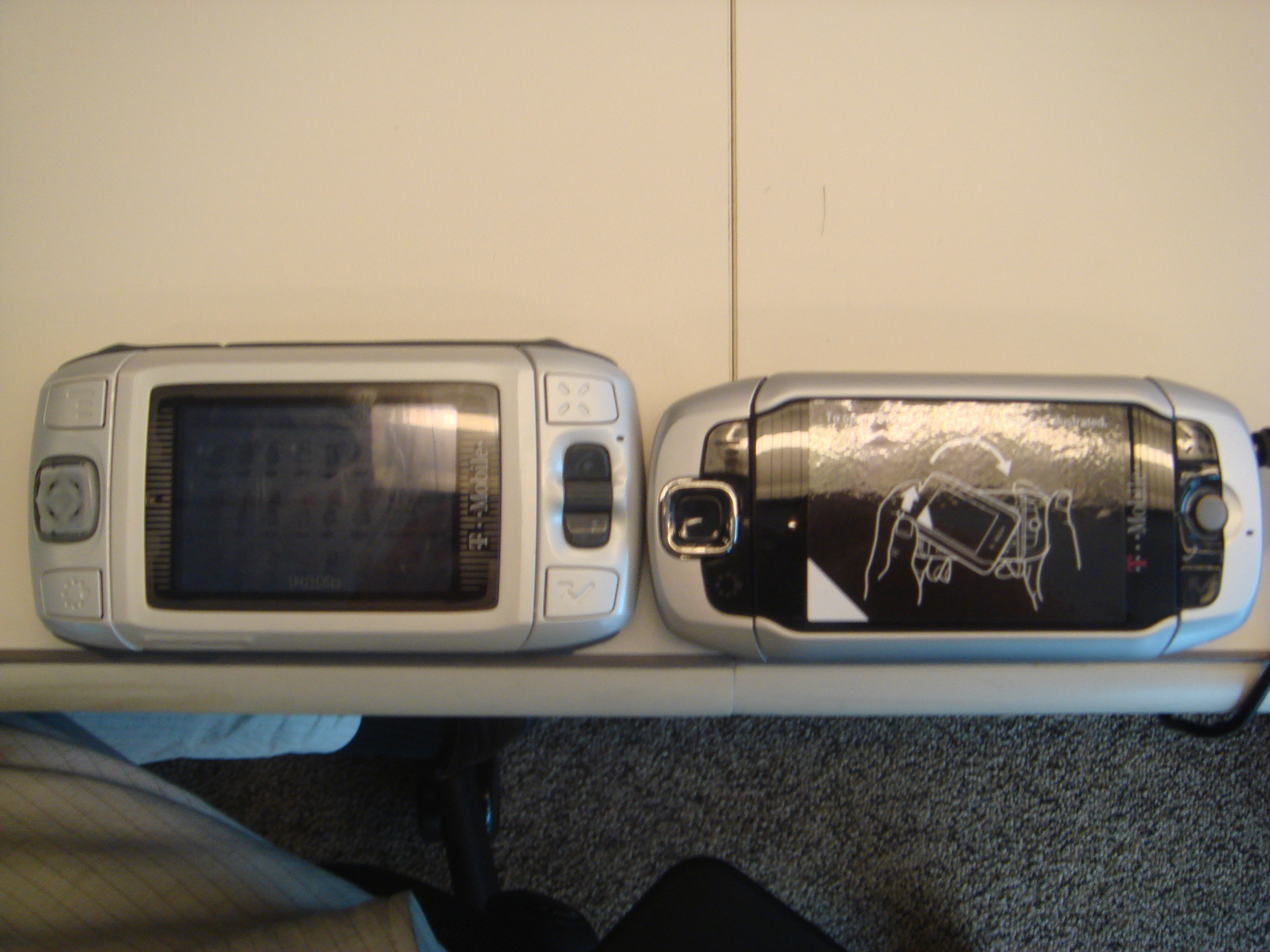
Side by side Hiptop2 (left) and Hiptop3 (right)

==== Limited edition ====
The T-Mobile USA Sidekick 3 was made available in three limited edition models which only differed in cosmetic color changes:

- Diane von Fürstenberg—Black with pink lips; released October 30, 2006
- Lifted Research Group—Green with tree logos
- Dwyane Wade—White and gold with a basketball texture; released February 1, 2007, to coincide with the NBA All-Star Game of February 17, 2007

=== T-Mobile Sidekick iD (Sharp) ===
The Sidekick iD is a smaller version of the Sidekick 3, unveiled on April 13, 2007. The Sidekick iD was aimed at younger, less affluent customers, with a price of $99 (on a two-year contract) which was half of the Sidekick 3. To reduce the cost of the Sidekick iD, the creators, (Sharp), removed some of the features of the Sidekick 3, including the 1.3-megapixel camera, the Bluetooth capability, and its media player. However it did retain the Sidekick-patented swivel screen, the hidden keyboard, and the trackball. A unique new physical feature were removable colored "bumpers", allowing the appearance of the Sidekick to be easily changed and were available in various colors.

=== T-Mobile Sidekick LX (Sharp) ===
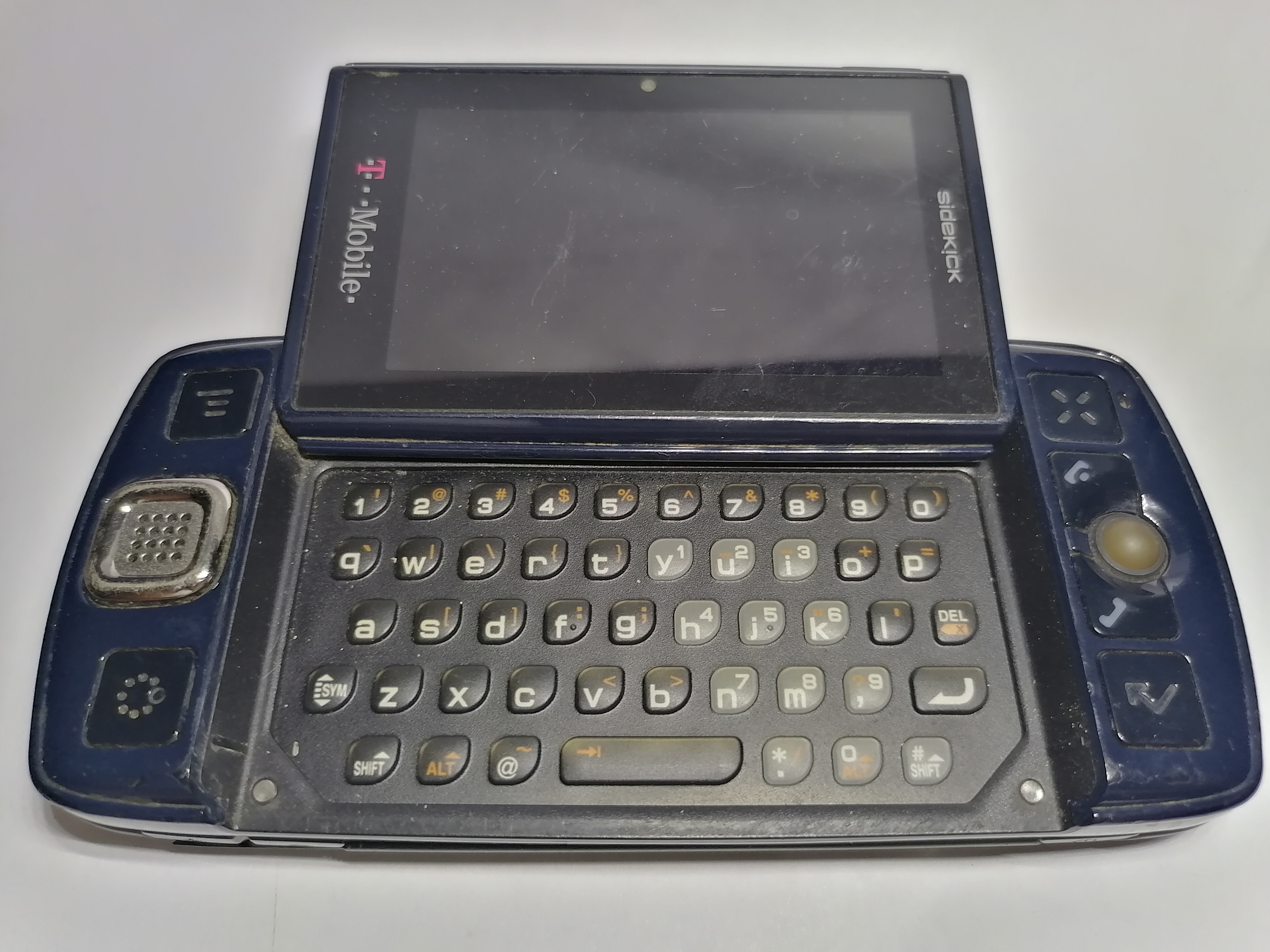
The T-Mobile Sidekick LX

The T-Mobile Sidekick LX (model no. PV-250) was announced on September 26, 2007 and released on October 17, 2007. It was sold in two different colors: Midnight Blue and Espresso Brown. In addition to the two color selections, the LX includes a wider, higher-resolution screen, blue LED mood lights on all four corners which coordinate to the user's settings, downloadable music and backgrounds, a lighter weight, MMS messaging, and a Micro SD card slot with a 128 MB card included, and an updated operating system.

On July 16, 2008, T-Mobile released a limited edition Tony Hawk Edition Sidekick LX, which includes video recording.

Despite production models being made for testing, ultimately the LX was never released in Australia due to a lack of compatibility with Telstra's 3G 850Mhz network, however Telstra went ahead with selling the Slide after the Hiptop3.

=== hiptop slide / Sidekick Slide (Motorola) ===
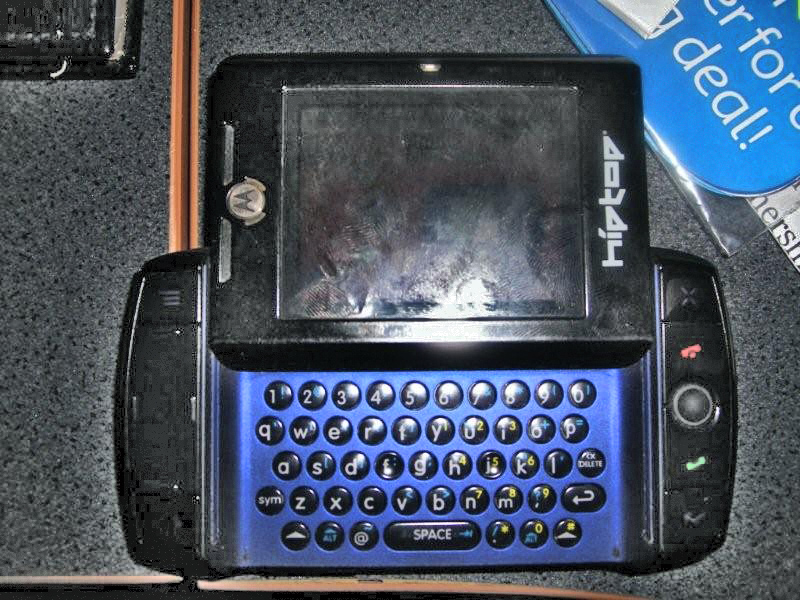
Hiptop Slide as sold in Australia

Manufactured by Motorola (model no. Q700), the Sidekick Slide was released on November 7, 2007 on T-Mobile US. Unlike the Sidekick LX, the Slide also received releases elsewhere: it was released under the name Hiptop Slide (stylized hiptop slide) through Telstra in Australia on November 5, 2007, and was later released in the UK and Germany by T-Mobile. Unlike other Hiptops/Sidekicks, this model has a non-swivel, slider form factor for revealing the keyboard. On May 16, 2008, a new version of the Sidekick Slide was released, named the Sidekick Slide Scarlet, coming in a red colored body.

It runs on the updated version 4.0 of Danger OS. Like the LX, this Sidekick for T-Mobile USA adds the MMS picture messaging capability and provides support for T-Mobile MyFaves plans. The T-Mobile Sidekick Slide, although less expensive than the LX, provides various hardware upgrades: these include 128 MB RAM and 225 MHz TI OMAP 850 processor (as opposed to the Sidekick 3 and LX's 64 MB RAM and 200 MHz OMAP 331 processor), and a second speaker which is located on the back of the device, as opposed to the Hiptop3 and LX's reliance on the D-pad speaker for both calls and music playback.

The Sidekick Slide was officially discontinued on August 8, 2008.

==== Failure and sales suspension ====
T-Mobile USA suspended sales of the Sidekick Slide on November 16, 2007, after Motorola confirmed that some devices inadvertently powered off when the slide door on the front side of the phone was opened or closed. On November 21, 2007, Motorola stated the failures were triggered by poor battery contacts; sliding the screen out to type on the keyboard sometimes loosened the contact and forced the device to shut off momentarily. On December 6, 2007, the Sidekick Slide was once again available for purchase.

=== T-Mobile Sidekick 2008 (Sharp) ===
Announced on July 30, 2008, the new model officially named solely as T-Mobile Sidekick (but often referred to as "Sidekick 2008" to distinguish) was the first Sidekick to be introduced following the acquisition of Danger by Microsoft. The Sidekick 2008 has improved features such as a high resolution 2-megapixel camera and video functionality for AIM. It also went back to the swivel Qwerty design, including changeable face/backplates.

=== T-Mobile Sidekick LX 2009 (Sharp) ===
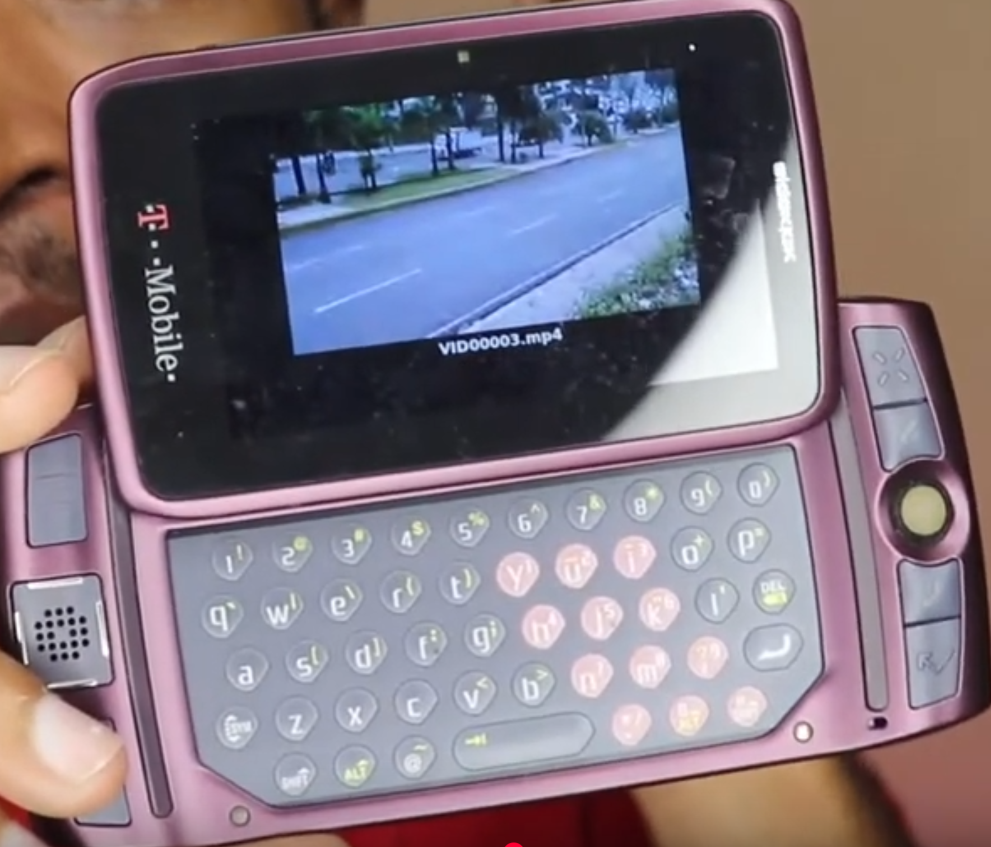
T-Mobile Sidekick LX (2009 edition)

The 2009 edition of the Sidekick LX (model no. PV-300), often referred to as "Sidekick LX 2009" (known during the development phase as the "Sidekick Blade") was unveiled on April 17, 2009 and released on May 13, 2009, sold in "Orchid" and "Carbon" skins. The new handset supports 3G and HSDPA, and makes various changes to the hardware, including a 3.2 inch F-WVGA display with 854×480 resolution, and a 3.2-megapixel camera with autofocus and flash.

However, most of the known changes involve software and improved functionality for social networking applications. Support for Facebook, Twitter and MySpace is now native to the system, allowing the handset to pass along notifications in the status bar as it does with instant messaging, e-mail and so forth. YouTube streaming playback is also supported on the system through Flash Lite.

The Sidekick LX 2009 offered synchronization with Microsoft Outlook and Microsoft Exchange, through a download via the applications catalog. The highest-profile addition to the handset was Bing (then called "Live Search"), was added and integrated with the new GPS functionality; the mapping software previously relied on cell-tower triangulation (a far less accurate process). The application included turn-by-turn navigation.

Both the Sidekick LX 2009 and Sidekick 2008 were discontinued on July 2, 2010.

== Software ==
The Hiptop operating system, referred to as DangerOS, is one of very few Java-based operating systems. Even the device drivers were developed in Java. Elements of DangerOS's architecture was used later by Andy Rubin to create the Android operating system. The Sidekick LX 2009 model runs DangerOS 5.0 which is based on NetBSD.

Each Sidekick had an instant messaging (IM) client (with AIM, Yahoo Messenger, and MSN Messenger); an Email client with an included T-Mail account; a pre-installed game (Rockets and Rocks or Bob's Journey); an organizer with planner, a calendar, and calculator; an SMS and phone app; a Download Fun catalog (also called Catalog on Hiptop devices); and later devices had a variety of social networking apps accessed from a section called Communities. Devices released in Europe also had a WAP browser (Wapaka) developed by the French company Digital Airways.

A cloud service backed up all personal data like settings, planner, notes, calendar, photos and all contacts. It was accessible and also editable on a web interface. A factory reset or new device was able to restore all personal data by signing in with the person's username and password.

As of January 2009, Danger OS had a 3% share in US smartphone traffic, behind iPhone OS, BlackBerry OS, Windows Mobile and Palm OS.

=== App development ===
For Hiptop development, Danger has its own proprietary APIs, which are a subset of J2SE with their own extensions. Danger introduced support for Java ME, the Java language optimized for mobile devices, to its OS with the release of OS 2.3. To aid third-party software design, Danger released a comprehensive software development kit (SDK) that contained a Hiptop simulator, development installation utilities, and Danger API information. The SDK was available without charge from Danger's development website.

Application developers can bypass the Catalog, the only way for the public to install apps, by using the included programs in the Danger Hiptop SDK to install user-written applications to the Hiptop device directly. To do this, you had to apply for a special software key known as a Danger Developer Key. The Danger Developer Key is a special security certificate that is provided by Danger that enables the device to be used as a Development Device. This will allow the installation of user-written applications to the device, but will void any software warranty provided by Danger and/or your wireless carrier. Any applicable hardware warranties should still apply.

While DangerOS uses .jar files for applications, they are uploaded to the device in special files called "bundles". Bundle files have the extension '.bndl'. Each bundle file is linked to a specific operating system version and build number. For example, a bundle file for v3.4/155053 (T-Mobile Sidekick 3) would be denied installation on a v3.3/149695 device (T-Mobile Sidekick iD). Installation of bundles require a developer key to be installed on your device if you are using a Production OS. Internal OS builds do not require developer keys.

== Sales and marketing ==
As of late 2005, it was estimated that there were 250,000 subscribers to the Sidekick on T-Mobile's network in the US. As of 2009, it has been estimated that one million Sidekicks had been sold. While the phone had a cult following, it generally only achieved modest sales.

=== In popular culture ===
The T-Mobile Sidekick became a popular choice for known American celebrities which played a great part in increasing its public popularity and recognizability. Skateboarder Tony Hawk was quoted as saying "I can’t live without my Sidekick", "I take it everywhere with me", in 2004. In February 2005, the device and Danger attracted much media attention after a Sidekick used by Paris Hilton was hacked.

A Sidekick II is prominently used by the protagonist in The Devil Wears Prada (2006). A Midnight Blue Sidekick LX was featured in the video game Midnight Club: Los Angeles (2008).

=== In Europe ===
In addition to the US, T-Mobile of Germany also offered the Sidekick as well T-Mobile UK and T-Mobile Austria as of 2006. Additionally, E-Plus in Germany and KPN in the Netherlands also carried and offered the device. The Hiptop/Sidekick was not carried by any French carriers. As opposed to the US, the phone did not manage to catch on and gain significant popularity throughout Europe. This is partly due to the view that it had outdated features.

== 2009 data service outage ==
On October 2, 2009, Microsoft (the owner of Danger, Inc.) lost the ability to access user data for T-Mobile US Sidekick subscribers temporarily. Subscriber data loss included contacts, notes, calendars and photos. Some data was restored within 14 days of the outage, but most of the data was restored between October 8 and the end of November. Early reports stating T-Mobile and Microsoft had lost all customer data as a result of a server failure at Microsoft proved to be untrue.

Sidekick user data is stored at Danger facilities, under the ownership of Microsoft. Unsubstantiated reports suggest Microsoft vendor Hitachi, Danger's storage area network (SAN) provider, may have had a part in the temporary data loss. Lawsuits against Microsoft claim that Microsoft had inadequate backups or an insufficient disaster recovery plan. A litigation against Microsoft and others was settled in 2011.

As a result of the outage, T-Mobile suspended sales of all Sidekicks and Sidekick Data Plans until the outage was resolved. Sales and new activations resumed on November 16, 2009.

== Discontinuation and related devices ==
T-Mobile announced on July 2, 2010, that the Sidekick LX 09 and Sidekick 2008 would no longer be available through T-Mobile. Later, Danger notified its development community via their Danger Developer Zone forums that it would no longer accept submissions for its application store, called the Catalog, on September 21, 2010. The development of applications for the Sidekick platform was also halted on September 21, 2010. This was followed by the closure of the Danger Developer Zone forums and related archives September 30, 2010.

=== Mobilicity Mobiflip and Sharp Jump ===
While the T-Mobile Sidekick LX 2009 was no longer sold from July 2, 2010 onwards, a modified version of the device was released in December 2010 in Canada, by carrier Mobilicity, under the name "Mobiflip" (model no. PV300G), while in the US, regional carrier Cincinnati Bell began selling the "Sharp Jump" (model no. PV300GC) in March 2011. Both devices have a modified version of the Danger OS installed, although any mention of Danger has been removed. This modified OS is independent of any backend service: the original Danger web browser, instant messaging and email apps are replaced respectively with Opera Mini, a universal (XMPP compatible) IM client, and without any email clients installed, and there is no Catalog service available.

=== Danger cloud service shutdown ===
On February 28, 2011, Engadget reported Microsoft would discontinue Danger's cloud service on May 31, 2011. After that date, Sidekicks no longer had access to any data services, though voice service still functioned. The service had already shut down earlier, April 30, 2009, in Canada.

In Australia, the Telstra Hiptop service was continued for existing customers after May 31, 2011, when the T-Mobile USA Sidekick service was shut down. Then, it was announced that the Hiptop service for Telstra customers was to be discontinued on October 4, 2011. Selected affected customers received a free Samsung Galaxy 555 to replace their Hiptop devices.

=== T-Mobile Sidekick 4G (Samsung) ===
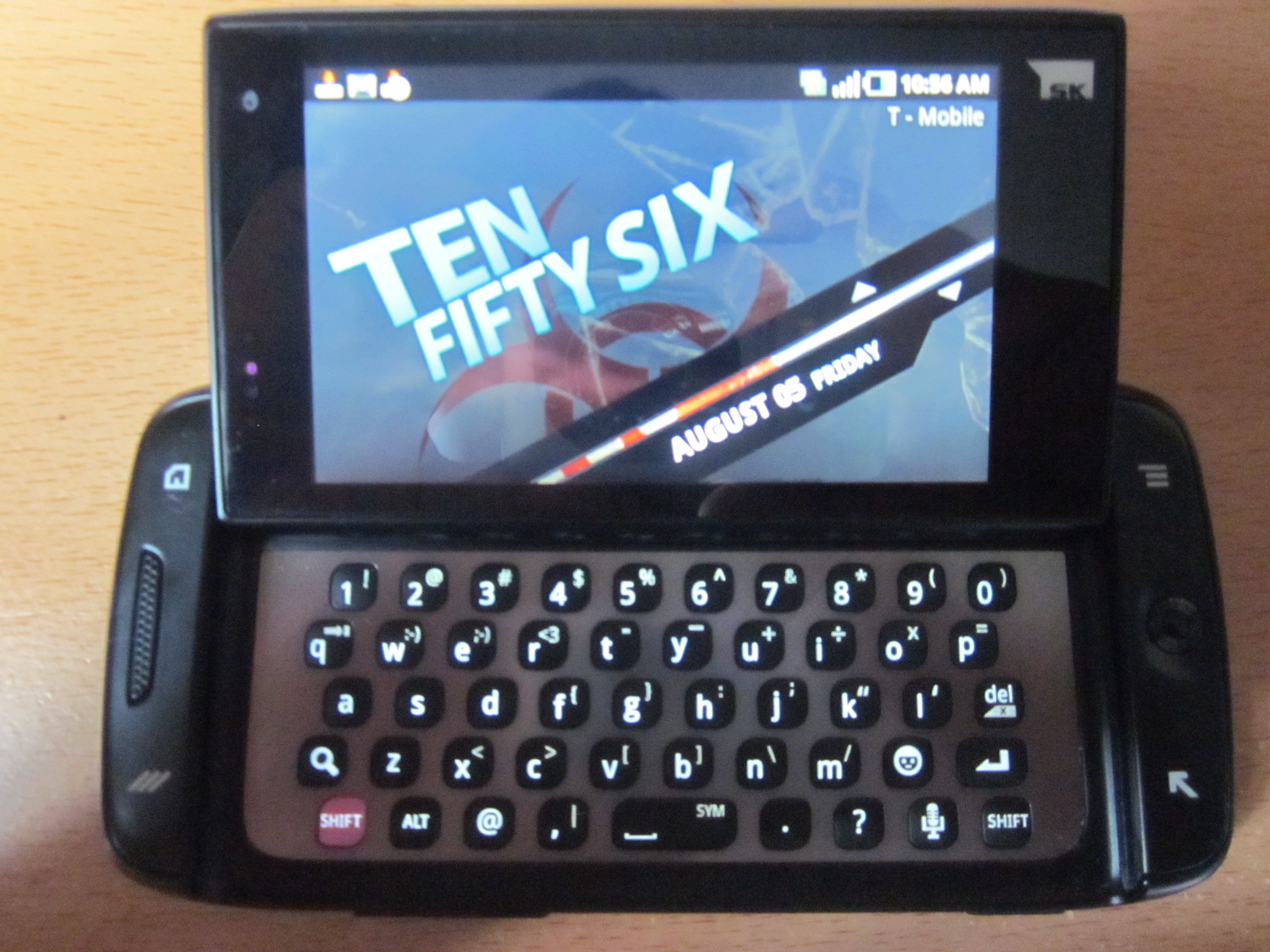
T-Mobile Sidekick 4G

On April 13, 2011, T-Mobile revived the Sidekick brand for a new HSPA+-compatible Android smartphone developed by Samsung, known as the Sidekick 4G, based on the Galaxy S. They are technically not true 4G as T-Mobile at the time marketed its 3G HSPA+ network as "4G".

The T-Mobile Sidekick 4G incorporates features from the original series, including the keyboard, 3.2-megapixel camera (minus LED flash), and the four-button layout, and adds a new Android-powered interface incorporating elements from the Hiptop's operating system. It should not be confused for a Danger device, to which these have no relation other than the T-Mobile exclusive "Sidekick" branding.

== Usage by the deaf and hard-of-hearing ==
When the Hiptop/T-Mobile Sidekick was initially released in late 2002, it was the only cellular phone to factory integrate an instant messaging client, specifically AOL Instant Messenger. This text-based communications medium, along with on-device email and a full QWERTY keyboard, made it popular with the deaf community, providing a telecommunications tool for use both inside and outside the home. Almost immediately it began replacing the dominant wireless devices used by the deaf at that time, namely Motorola's Talkabout T900, PageWriter, and Timeport, as well as the early RIM and BlackBerry e-mail pagers manufactured by Research In Motion.

The Hiptop/T-Mobile Sidekick's importance to the deaf was further solidified in March 2003 when it became the first cellular phone capable of placing unassisted TDD and Relay Operator calls through the phone's web browser using a system developed by Jon B. Sharpe at Lormar Logic Company. Lormar Logic enhanced the TDD/Relay Operator system in August 2003 by developing a means for the deaf to place calls through AOL Instant Messenger.

MCI Relay followed two months later with a Relay Operator system accessible through telnet. MCI Relay and Hamilton Relay both released AOL Instant Messenger relay systems in July of the following year. By 2005, at least four Relay Operator providers (Hamilton, MCI, Sprint, Sorenson, and i711) were providing direct Relay Operator access from the Sidekick using either one of the instant messenger clients or through a free download from the Catalog, and two companies (Lormar Logic and i711) were providing direct TDD access. The software for these is provided at no additional charge in addition to the normal data plan. The free Lormar Logic service also provides the Deaf with direct encrypted calling to the United States Social Security Administration and the Internal Revenue Service. The i711 client provides extra services to the Deaf at an additional fee (such as AAA roadside services, and finding Open Captioned movies, etc.).

Access to direct TDD and relay operator communications has allowed the Hiptop/T-Mobile Sidekick and similar devices to, in many cases, replace the use of standard TDD machines, and its dominance is clearly illustrated by the evolution of its own sign in American Sign Language, made using both hands to mimic the opening of the rotating screen.

T-Mobile's decision to offer a "data only" wireless plan, thereby eliminating charges for unusable voice minutes, also played a role in the device's dominance in the deaf community. Additionally, some local deaf non-profit groups in the U.S. will either pay all or part of the cost of the device/monthly service fees for the user to keep them "connected". Other groups have set up discount programs, where Deaf users receive a discount on the cost of the device and monthly service fee based on the number of members in the group.

== Model comparison ==
Marketing name	hiptop / Sidekick	hiptop^{2} / Sidekick II	hiptop^{3} / Sidekick 3	Sidekick iD	Sidekick LX	hiptop slide / Sidekick Slide	Sidekick (2008)	Sidekick LX (2009)
Model number		Sharp PV-100	Sharp PV-200	Sharp PV-150	Sharp PV-250	Motorola Q700	Sharp PV-210	Sharp PV-300
Cellular bands	GSM triband	GSM triband	GSM triband	GSM dual-band (850/1900)	GSM quad-band	GSM quad-band	GSM quad-band	GSM quad-band / UMTS/HSDPA dual-band
Display	240×160 pixel 4-bit monochrome (65K color on the color model variant)	2.6 inch 240×160 pixel TFT 65K color	2.6 inch 240×160 pixel TFT 65K color	3.0 inch 240×160 pixel TFT 65K color	3.0 inch 400×240 (WQVGA) pixel TFT	2.0 inch 320×240 (QVGA) pixel	2.6 inch 400×240 (WQVGA) pixel TFT	3.2 inch 854×480 (FWVGA) pixel TFT
Memory	16MB RAM (32MB RAM on color model)	32MB RAM	64MB RAM	64MB RAM	64MB RAM	128MB RAM	128MB RAM	128MB RAM
Camera	No	0.3 megapixel with flash	1.3 megapixel with flash	No	1.3 megapixel with flash	1.3 megapixel	2 megapixel, video recording	3.2 megapixel with flash, autofocus, video recording
Bluetooth	No	No	Bluetooth 1.2	No	Bluetooth 2.0	Bluetooth 2.0	Bluetooth 2.0	Bluetooth 2.0
Dimensions	2.6 in (66 mm) H; 4.5 in (110 mm) W; 1.1 in (28 mm) D	2.6 in (66 mm) H; 5.1 in (130 mm) W; 0.9 in (23 mm) D	2.3 in (58 mm) H; 5.1 in (130 mm) W; 0.8 in (20 mm) D	2.4 in (61 mm) H; 5.1 in (130 mm) W; 0.8 in (20 mm) D	2.4 in (61 mm) H; 5.1 in (130 mm) W; 0.6 in (15 mm) D	2.6 in (66 mm) H; 4.6 in (120 mm) W; 0.6 in (15 mm) D	2.3 in (58 mm) H; 4.7 in (120 mm) W; 0.7 in (18 mm) D	2.4 in (61 mm) H; 5.1 in (130 mm) W; 0.6 in (15 mm) D
Weight	6.2 oz (180 g)	6.5 oz (180 g)	6.7 oz (190 g)	6.2 oz (180 g)	5.7 oz (160 g)	5.3 oz (150 g)	4.8 oz (140 g)	5.7 oz (160 g)

== See also ==
- EnV
- Helio Ocean
- HTC Dream
- HTC Touch Pro2
- HTC Wizard
- iPhone
- Microsoft KIN
- N-Gage
- Ogo
- Palm Pixi
- Pogo
- Sony Ericsson P800
- Sony Mylo
