= Sony CLIÉ UX Series =

Multimedia PDA model line

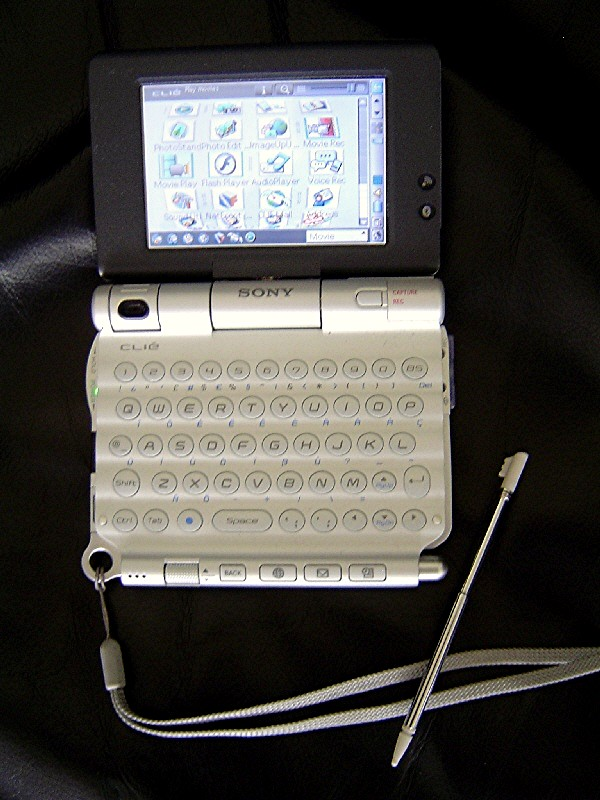
Sony CLIÉ PEG-UX50

The Sony Clie UX series were premium multimedia PDAs announced by Sony in July 2003, running Palm OS (version 5). These devices were advertised as being a "personal entertainment communicator", a purpose not dissimilar to the Apple iPod Touch released in 2007. Two models were released, featuring a "palm-top" clamshell design, with a landscape tilting and swiveling LCD screen.

The UX40 and UX50 were largely identical, with the exception of their wireless connectivity. The UX50 included both bluetooth and built-in Wi-Fi support, while the UX40 was US$100 cheaper but only featured bluetooth. Users of these devices frequently experienced difficulty connecting to other devices via Bluetooth. The UX40 was, for a time, sold at Costco, while the UX50 was not. A UX70h model with integrated cellular capabilities was also developed, but never saw public release.

== Sony Handheld Engine Processor ==
The processor used on the UX series was the Sony Handheld Engine CXD2230GA. At the time of release this processor was bleeding edge, demonstrating new improvements in both capability integration and power efficiency in a single System-on-a-chip.

== Specifications ==
- Processor: Sony Handheld Engine™ CXD2230GA
- Operating System: Palm OS software version v.5.2
- Memory: Total 104 MB (16 MB available for storage of files and programs. Additional 16 MB available for system back up. Additional 29 MB available for media storage)
- Display: TFT LCD color display with backlight, 480 × 320 dots; 65,536 colors
- Connectivity: USB (for HotSync operation), Infrared (IrDA 1.2), Bluetooth. Wireless LAN (IEEE 802.11b Wi-Fi) on UX50.
- Digital Camera (0.3MP)
- Video Recording (MPEG4, 30 fps, CIF 160 × 112)
- Multimedia: MP3 playback / MPEG4 Video Playback / Flash Player / Audio Recorder / Web Browser / E-mail
- Expansion: Memory Stick media (recognizes Magic Gate & Memory Stick Pro cards)
- Dimensions and Weight: Approx. 4 1/8 by 3 1/2 by 23/32 inch (105 mm × 89 mm × 18 mm) (projecting parts not included), Approx. 6.2 ounces (180 g) (including stylus)
- Power: Output: DC 5.2 V Input: 100–240 V AC
- Battery: Lithium-ion polymer rechargeable battery (internal, non user removable)
