= Mylo (Sony) =

Handheld Internet wi-fi device, 2006–2010

My Life Online (MYLO)
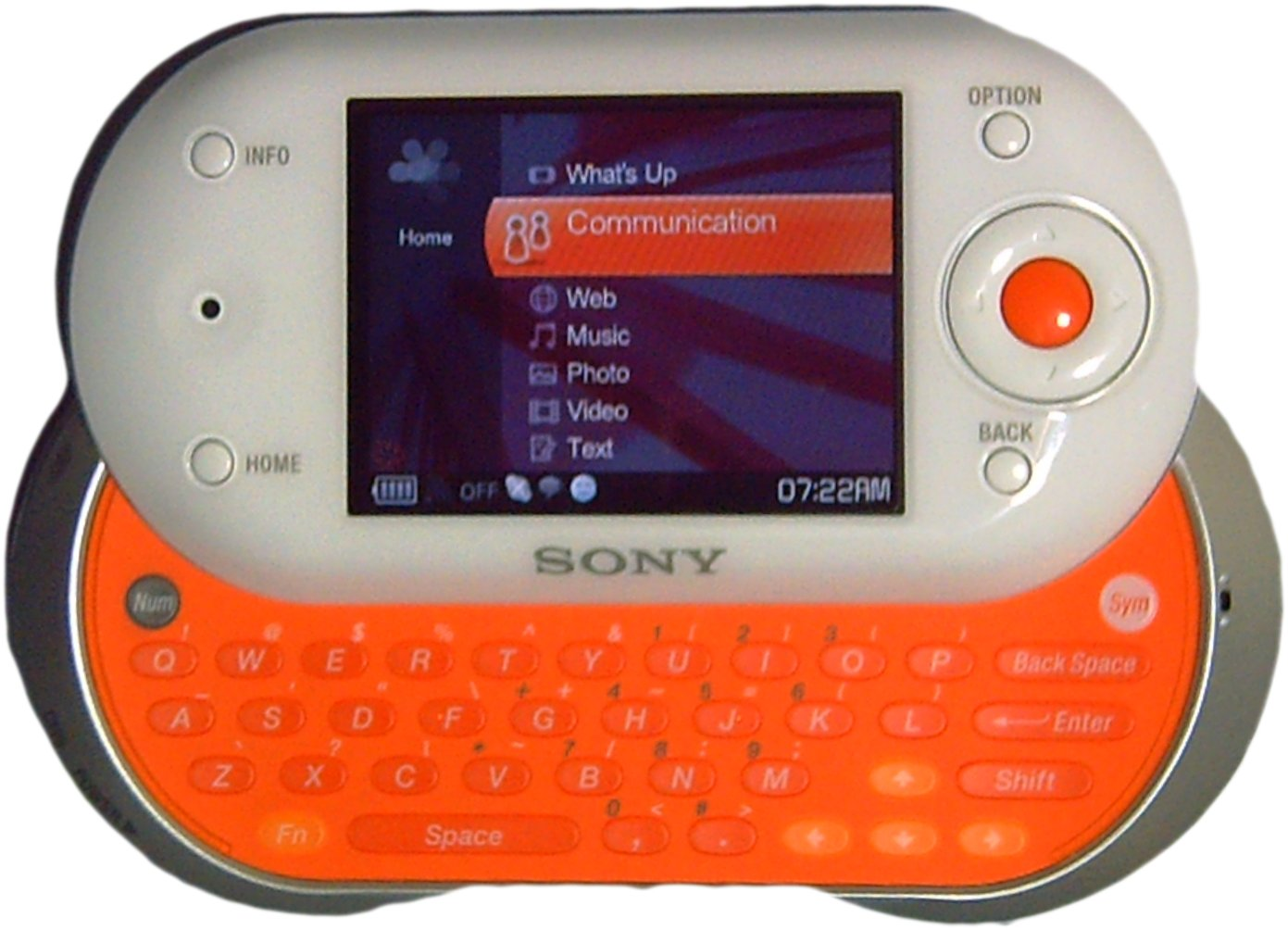
- mylo COM–1
- Manufacturer: Sony
- Released: September 15, 2006
- Lifespan: 2006–2010
- Discontinued: 2010
- Media: Memory Stick PRO Duo
- Operating system: Qtopia
- CPU: ARM
- Display: 3.5" TFT LCD 800×480 pixel touchscreen (COM–2); 2.4" TFT 320×240 pixel (COM–1)
- Camera: Yes (COM–2 only)
- Connectivity: 802.11b/g Wi-Fi (COM–2); 802.11b Wi-Fi (COM–1)
- Dimensions: 130.8 × 20.7 × 64.6 mm (COM–2); 123 × 23.9 × 63 mm (COM–1)

Mylo, standing for "My Life Online", is a pocket-sized handheld device created and marketed by Sony for instant messaging and other Internet-based communications like browsing Internet web sites using the Opera web browser, and playback and sharing of media files. Debuting in 2006, Mylo had a screen which slid up to reveal a QWERTY keyboard. Using Wi-Fi instead of cellular networks — reducing connectivity costs by avoiding the necessity of using GSM, CDMA or 3G cellular networks which would usually be used for devices of this size and functionality — the Mylo was targeted to the 18–24 age group. A revised model was released in 2008.

== History and design ==
Mylo COM–1

The first version of the Sony mylo was launched on September 15, 2006, and includes 1 GB of onboard flash memory and a Memory Stick PRO Duo expansion slot.

The mylo is 23.9 mm (15/16 in) thick, 123 mm (4 7/8 in) wide, 63 mm (2 1/2 in) tall, and sports a 6.1 cm (2.4 in) QVGA (320 × 240) LCD screen. Its form factor is similar to the T-Mobile Sidekick in that it is held in landscape mode and has a slide out QWERTY keyboard. Its initial model colors were a glossy black and white.

Mylo COM–2

On January 6, 2008, the second edition of the Sony mylo was announced at CES 2008 in Las Vegas. This version was based on PSP technology and included AIM, a touchscreen, and a camera. The Internet Browser was changed from Opera to NetFront. It supported Adobe Flash for viewing Flash content such as YouTube videos and for playing Flash-based games. The mylo COM–2 had 1 GB flash memory that could be used for music and video playback. Two colors were available: black and white. The mylo COM–2 featured wireless G connectivity. The keyboard was backlit as well. System software version 1.201 added support for video recording. The mylo COM–2 was released on SonyStyle.com on January 25, 2008, for $299. It was reduced to $199 before the holiday season and was quickly drawn from production due to its poor sales.

== Software ==
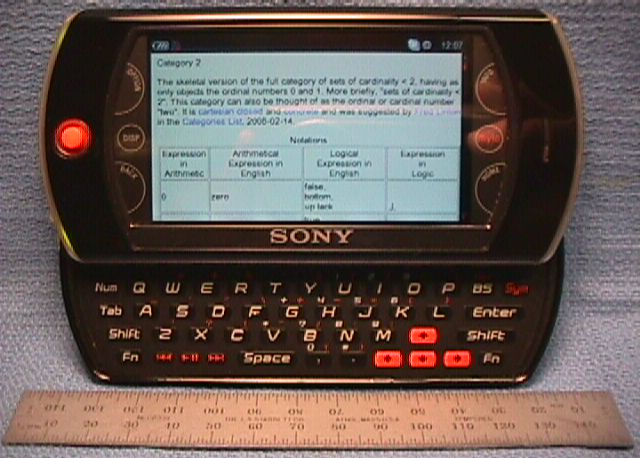
The mylo COM-2. The length of the steel rule is 15 cm.

The mylo's menu of software applications is grouped by function.

Communication

The following applications in the main menu group use the Wi-Fi connection:

- AIM. AOL Instant Messenger (COM–2 only)
- Skype. Includes the features: Dial (Skype to phone), Call (Skype to Skype), Chat (instant messaging), and Send (and Receive) Files. Also can receive (phone to Skype).
- Google Talk. Features text chats (instant messaging) with Google Talk and XMPP contacts. Included is a link to Gmail (WAP version).
- Yahoo! Messenger. The text messaging application also includes a link to Yahoo! Mail (WAP version).
- Ad Hoc Application. This Peer-to-peer lets the mylo share playlists and stream songs directly to another mylo.
- Cannot be used natively for sending or receiving text (SMS) messages to or from cell phones; it is strictly for messenger and web only.

Web

COM–1. The Opera web browser allows a number of configurations to help minimize the limitations of the small screen (320x240) including Zoom (%), Text Size (Small, Normal, Large) and View Mode (Normal or Fit to Screen).

COM–2. NetFront with support for Flash Lite is the web browser that is supplied with the mylo COM–2.

Media

COM–1. The player supports the MP3, WMA (secured and unsecured) and ATRAC 3 audio formats. The image viewer supports JPG, PNG, and Bitmap formats. The video player supports the MPEG-4/AAC video format. The text application is a simple text editor.

COM–2. The player supports the MP3, WMA (secured and unsecured), AAC (no DRM) and ATRAC3 formats. The image viewers supports JPEG, PNG and BMP formats. The video player supports the MPEG-4/AAC Simple Profile and MPEG-4/AAC AVC H.264 baseline profile. It also supports WMV starting with firmware version 1.101, which was released in April 2008.

On both models DRM content in Windows Media Audio and Adaptive Transform Acoustic Coding 3 is limited to the internal 1GB memory. DRM playback is not possible via Memory Stick as Magic Gate is not available and Windows Media DRM is not currently possible on Memory Sticks.

Tools

- The utilities in this menu group include the Connection Manager for managing the Wi-Fi configuration, a File Manager, a firmware System Update tool.

== Connectivity ==
With the USB mode configuration set to the default (MSC) the mylo acts as a USB mass-storage device. Music and other files can then be transferred from a PC with the included SonicStage software or by dragging and dropping using a file manager. With the USB mode set to MTP you can synchronize audio files via WMP 10. While connected via USB, the mylo screen displays the USB mode currently in use and suspends whatever program had been running.

The 802.11b Wi-Fi connection is started either with the Wireless LAN slider button or automatically when one of mylo's Internet applications (i.e., Skype, Yahoo! Messenger, Google Talk, Opera) attempt to access the network and an infrastructure mode Wi-Fi connection has not yet been established. The Wi-Fi mode can be switched to Ad Hoc mode to enable use of the Ad Hoc Application. Although the device is marketed for persons on the go, the Mylo does not have any commonly used Bluetooth capabilities, to provide easy connection with other wireless carrier enabled mobile devices.

Owners of the COM-1 model receive access to any T-Mobile Hotspot for the first year. Owners of the COM–2 model receive access to over 10,000 Wayport Hotspot locations nationwide, through December 31, 2010. Over 9,000 of these locations are McDonald's restaurants.

== Mylo models ==
Model (and generation)		Image	Capacity	Changes introduced	Connection	Original release date	Launch price (US$)
COM–1	1G	Mylo Com-1	1 GB	First release. Available in White or Black.	USB, Wi-Fi (b)	September 2006	$349.99
COM–2	2G	Mylo Com-2	1 GB	Second release. Available in White or Black.	USB, Wi-Fi (b/g)	February 2008	$299.99

== Specifications ==
Processor: Freescale i.MX21 (for the COM–1)

As a device, the mylo COM– 1 sports a 2.4-inch 320 by 240 LCD, 400 MB for flash memory (upgradable to 4 GB), mini-USB connectivity, a Memory Stick Duo slot, integrated 802.11b wireless networking (supporting WEP and WPA-PSK security), and a lithium-ion battery offering up to 45 hours of music playback, 8 hours of video time, and up to 76 hours of VoIP talk time. Add to that a DC input for charging or running "wired" with the AC adapter, a 10-pin headphone/microphone interface (an adapter is included), a slide-out QWERTY keyboard for composing messages, and a total weight of about 157 grams (5.5 ounces), including the battery.

== See also ==
- Danger Hiptop / T-Mobile Sidekick
- Ogo
- PlayStation Portable
