= Ogo (handheld device) =

2004 electronic messenger

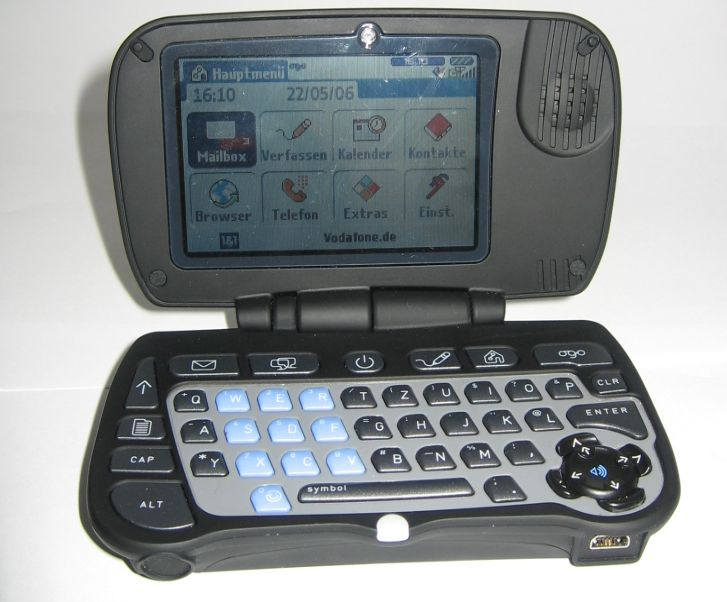
German Ogo

Ogo is a handheld electronic device that enables communication via instant messaging services, email, MMS and SMS text messages. The device works through GSM cellular networks and allows unlimited usage for a flat monthly fee. It supports AOL Instant Messenger, Yahoo! Messenger, and MSN Messenger. It was released in 2004.

== Overview ==
Ogo uses the IXI-Connect OS. It features a clamshell design with a 12-bit depth color screen on the top half and a full QWERTY keyboard on the lower half. Navigation through the menus is accomplished primarily through the use of a directional pad located on the lower right hand of the device and alternately through buttons that directly access each of the devices features.

The Ogo is part of a family of devices produced by its overseas manufacturer, IXI, which showcase the "personal mobile gateway" concept, wherein the Ogo acts as a wireless gateway for other Bluetooth enabled devices to access the Internet. Other devices in the family include pens and cameras. With support for AOL Instant Messenger, Yahoo Instant Messenger, and MSN Windows Messenger, it's at least as equipped for IM as any phone you could hope for. The Ogo supports POP3 e-mail, but that's about it. The Ogo is not a phone and has no voice features.

AT&T deliberately omitted the wireless gateway capabilities of the Ogo in all domestic advertising, possibly in a bid to keep the device from being used as a flat-rate wireless modem.

After the acquisition of AT&T Wireless by Cingular, the Ogo was no longer offered. Cingular discontinued its Ogo service on October 10, 2006.

The device is also marketed in Germany by 1&1. In Germany, the OGO is called a Pocket Web. The OGO can web surf, email, sync with outlook, IM and all the other things like the US based OGO but can not play MP3s. It is also available in Austria through A1 and in Switzerland through Swisscom carrier.

== Technical data ==
Size

11.5 cm × 7.5 cm × 2.5 cm

Weight

162 g

Display

240×160 Pixel = 1/8 VGA with 4096 Colors

Battery Life

120 hours standby, 2.5 hours fully functioning, charges with a normal USB Mini-Cable (5V)

Ports

Mini USB, Headphone connection (for the CT-17 and CT-12 version)

Optical Highlights

Backlighting for monitor and for keyboard, 2 color LED for new messages and for charging

Speaker

Monospeaker, 0.8 watt with 8 Ω

Processor

Texas Instruments OMAP P330B with 200 MHz

Memory

16 MB-RAM and 32 MB NAND-ROM Flash memory (Samsung)

Wireless connections

Quadband Chip w/ memory ROM, Dualband 900/1800 (CT-17/CT-12) i.e. 850/1900 (CT-15/CT-10) GSM with GPRS-with data relay capabilities SAR 0.596 W/kg

Keyboard

QWERTZ keyboard, Navi button

Software Base

Operating System

IXI-Connect OS proprietary system written in C, kernel is based on NucleosOS

Browser

Obigo Browser: Gecko Engine (like Mozilla 4.0)

Protocols

IMAP, HTTP, WSP, SyncML, FOTA, RSS

== Wireless data ==
The Ogo is indeed capable of being used as a fully functional GPRS Bluetooth modem. Connectivity to Windows and Apple computers is still possible, provided a still-activated Ogo is available. The device shows up as a standard bluetooth device.

The European version connects to the web and email push system via the Vodafone GPRS network.

== See also ==
- N-Gage (device)
- Mylo
- Helio Ocean
- T-Mobile Sidekick
- Nokia 770 Internet Tablet
