= Pogo Mobile and nVoy =

The Pogo Mobile was a GSM-based mobile device developed by British start-up Pogo Technology Ltd. It combined web browsing, messaging, audio playback and phone functionality in a portable form.

It used a server-side compression system to shrink web pages before sending to the device, improving the effective speed of the device by reducing the amount of data that needed to be sent to the device. A similar system is used by the Opera Mini browser available for most current mobile phones.

The Pogo Mobile was launched in 2001, only to be withdrawn from the market 2 years later when the manufacturer went into liquidation.

== Features ==
=== GSM phone functionality ===
A fully functional GSM mobile phone.

=== Web browser ===
Full Internet access (dependent on website compatibility with Internet Explorer 5) using data compression to increase effective GSM speeds to the equivalent of around 70-80 kbit/s.

=== MP3 playback ===
MP3 files could be played from the MMC card.

=== Messaging ===
SMS and Internet email integrated into one inbox.

=== PIM functions ===
A diary and contacts facility was included, integrated into the phone and messaging functionality and synchronised with a cloud service.

=== Games ===
A number of Flash 4 games were included that made use of the device's touch-screen interface.

== Technology ==
The original Pogo device

The original Pogo was based on the Samsung S3C44A0 SoC with an ARM7 core at 33 MHz, 16 MB of DRAM, 4 MB of Flash ROM, 320x240 Transflective 256-colour LCD (Kyocera), Wavecom GSM module, Valence Li-Ion 1860mAh battery and Micronas DSP for audio functions. It also had an MMC slot compatible with PC formatted MMCs.

The OS (32-bit non-preemptive threaded) was written for high-performance on the ARM core with minimal memory footprint, and was around 700k when compiled from C++, including UI data files. It featured a full web-browser, including JavaScript, email, some games in Flash 4 and embedded database for addresses, links, etc., MP3 playback, full GSM phone functionality and local "client-server" design with a UI also implemented in Flash 4. The UI was designed to be operated via a touchscreen and a single button located on one of the "lugs" of the device (the other three corners housing the antenna, stylus and charger socket). Although a carbon-fibre stylus was included, the UI was designed to be operated by the owner's finger.

The "local server" operated in such a way that all machine functions - making a phone call, playing a sound file from MMC, or anything else, were implemented as small C++ "servlets" that the UI would invoke via the browser - the only UI was the browser, there was no other "GUI" library exported. For example, the url "http://devpogo/phone/call?number=0123456" would place a voice call to the specified number. A security mechanism existed to prevent unauthorised pages from invoking the local servlets.

As such, the user would never have to go online, or even know if the function being displayed was being served locally or remotely. This "thin client-thin network-server" model underpinned the whole product. Between handset and the network were proprietary protocols (see patent) and a proxy that looked like a "normal" browser to the wider internet. The proxy carried out much of the grunt-work of browsing - caching, JavaScript parsing, session management, re-formatting and compression - and together with the handset led to what was called the "distributed browser" model, with UI on the handset driven by compressed display deltas from the proxy.

Two major revisions of the OS took place, implementing 2-slot GPRS (19200 baud, an effective rate of 70-80 kbit/s) and "downloadable objects" - servlets that would install themselves locally on demand to extend the functionality of the device without user intervention.

A prototype of the nVoy

A third and final revision of the OS supported the nVoy, intended to be Pogo's next product. It was to have featured a 16-bit colour TFT LCD, camera, Samsung S3C440B0X SoC at 75 MHz, 16 MB of SDRAM, 16 MB of Flash ROM and enhanced Wavecom module. Macromedia also revised the terms of the Flash licence, so Macromedia Flash was removed and the UI replaced with an HTML version. The nVoy was a much sleeker design being 19 mm thick and taken up almost entirely by the screen. A version of the nVoy with a slide-out keyboard was also developed. The device was not mass-produced and never reached the market.

== History ==
The Pogo concept was developed within the London office of Razorfish in 1999. An Austrian Financier approached Razorfish claiming he wanted to be "in the Internet", and a number of ideas were presented to him. He initially funded some research into the concept, but declined to take the concept further.

The research lead to the observation that, at the time, most websites were made up of only around 25% of "content"; the rest of the data was structured metadata or markup that yielded easily to compression. Patented technologies were developed that could deliver web-sites over a 9600 GSM CSD link with performance similar to the 33.6K and 56K modems common at the time.

This initial work and the prototype hardware were funded by Razorfish Ventures ($250,000), and later by David Ishag who took the product to market (approximately £4m).

Prototype hardware was developed by Razorfish in New York, and design for manufacture of the launch device by Celestica in the UK. Celestica failed to achieve a viable BoM and misunderstood a number of key design points, so the electronic design was brought in house.

The initial product was readied in Winter 2001 and was runner up in the category of "Best New Handset Device" at the GSM Association Awards in Cannes in 2002.

An initial 5000 units were shipped to Carphone Warehouse in the UK and went on sale. Sales and marketing proved problematic with O2 launching the very first Windows Mobile phone, the XDA, and combined with some technical issues related to battery performance, sales failed to take off, despite a very enthusiastic userbase of around 1200 customers. The company went into voluntary liquidation in late 2002. The company and its assets were purchased by Ran Mokady, who invested a further £1m over the following year and re-developed the product into the nVoy. At the close of 2003, the company ceased trading and the staff all left.

== See also ==
- iPhone
- Opera Mini
- Danger Hiptop
- BlackBerry
