= Sony CLIÉ PEG-TH55 =

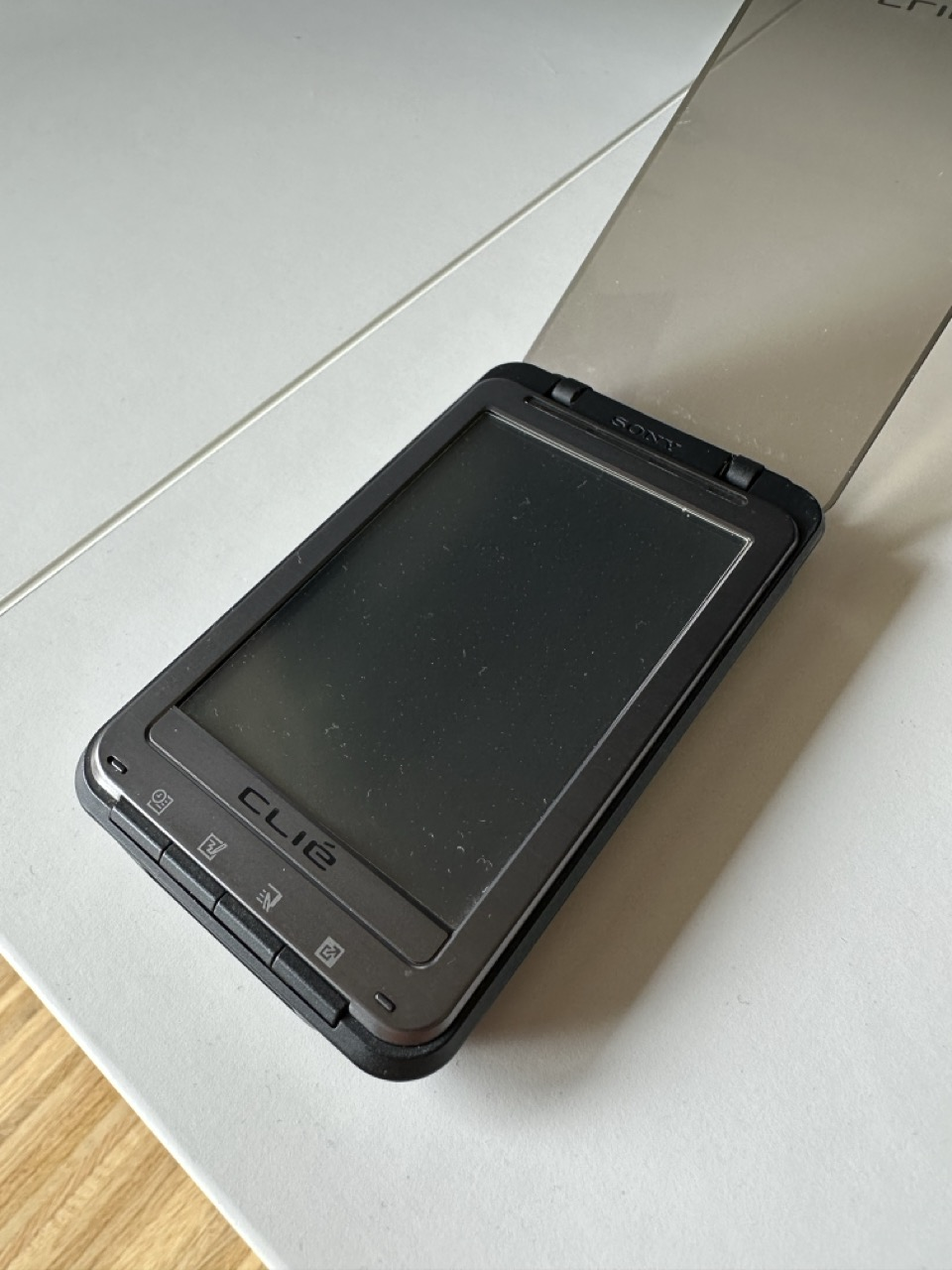

The Clié PEG-TH55 is a Personal Digital Assistant (PDA) which was manufactured by Sony. The PEG-TH55 ran Palm OS (version 5) and featured a built-in camera, Wi-Fi, Bluetooth on non-US versions and an MP3/Atrac Player.

== Specifications ==
- Palm OS: 5.2.1
- CPU: 123 MHz Sony Handheld Engine
- Memory: 32MB
- Display: 320 x 480, 16bit Colour, hardware assisted rotation and scaling
- Sound: Internal audio amplifier and speaker, hardware assisted MP3 decoding
- External Connectors: Sony T-series connector, headphone jack
- Expansion: Memory Stick Pro
- Wireless: Infrared, 802.11b, Bluetooth (on non-US versions)
- Camera: 640x480 CMOS with shutter
- Infrared: IRDA-compatible
- Battery: Rechargeable Li-Ion
- Size & Weight: 6.5 oz
- Colour: Gray, Black
