= Memory Stick =

Sony's removable flash memory card format, launched in July 1998

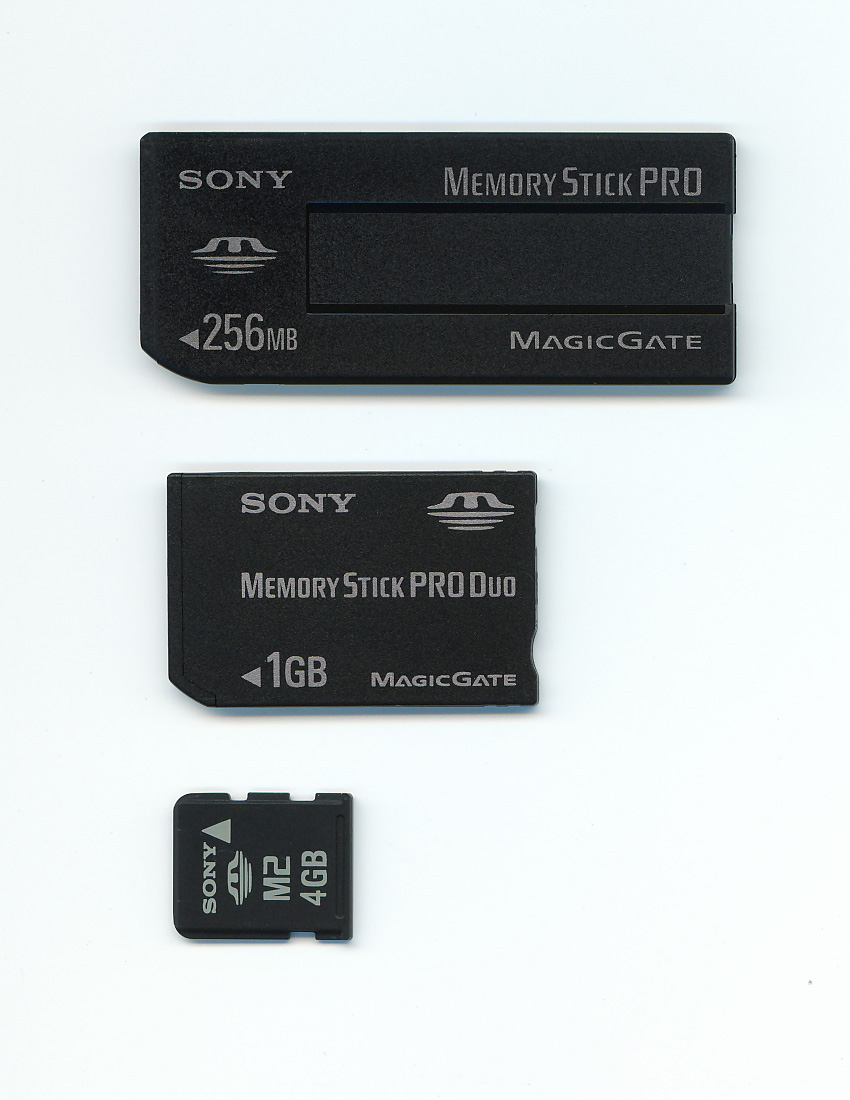
- From top to bottom: Memory Stick PRO, Memory Stick PRO Duo, Memory Stick Micro (M2)
- Media type: Flash memory card
- Capacity: 128 MB (Original); 32 GB (PRO series); 2 TB (XC series)
- Developed by: Sony
- Extended to: Memory Stick PRO, Memory Stick Duo, Memory Stick PRO Duo, Memory Stick PRO-HG Duo, and Memory Stick Micro

The Memory Stick is a removable flash memory card format, originally launched by Sony in late 1998. In addition to the original Memory Stick, this family includes the Memory Stick PRO, a revision that allows greater maximum storage capacity and faster file transfer speeds; Memory Stick Duo, a small-form-factor version of the Memory Stick (including the PRO Duo); the even smaller Memory Stick Micro (M2), and the Memory Stick PRO-HG, a high speed variant of the PRO to be used in high-definition video and still cameras.

As a proprietary format, Sony exclusively used Memory Stick on its products in the 2000s such as Cyber-shot digital cameras, Handycam digital camcorders, Sony Ericsson mobile phones, WEGA and Bravia TV sets, VAIO PCs, digital audio players, and the PlayStation Portable game console, with the format being licensed to a few other companies early in its lifetime. With the increasing popularity of Secure Digital around 2010, Sony started to include SD in their devices, marking a surrender by Sony of its format war in the memory card business and the end to further serious development of the format. Despite this, Sony continues to support Memory Stick on certain newer devices through the use of adaptors.

== History ==
The original Memory Stick was launched in October 1998 and was available in capacities up to 128 MB. (Note: In this article the unit symbol 'MB' is used to mean 1000^2 bytes (1 megabyte))

In October 1999, Sony licensed the technology to Fujitsu, Aiwa, Sanyo, Sharp, Pioneer and Kenwood, in a bid to avoid a repetition of the Betamax failure. Other companies were also licensees to the format. Some early examples of Memory Stick usage by third-party companies include Sharp's MP3 players, Alpine's in-dash players, and Epson's printers.

The format initially had an indifferent reception, but it soon increased in popularity, especially after the licensing deal. In spring 2001, Memory Stick attained 25% market share (against CompactFlash's 40% and SmartMedia's 32%), up from 7% a year earlier. By May 2001, total shipment of Memory Stick units surpassed 10 million.

However, the SD card, jointly developed by Toshiba, Panasonic and SanDisk, became widely popular among companies and was soon the most used flash format. By November 2003, it held 42% market share in the United States, ahead of CompactFlash's 26% and Memory Stick with 16%. Sony itself eventually became the only company to support the format. Sony was often criticized for the Memory Stick, as they were deemed to be expensive compared to other formats.

As of January 2010, it appeared that Sony had begun to combine support for SD/SDHC and Memory Stick formats in their products. All digital cameras and camcorders announced by Sony at the 2010 Consumer Electronics Show could use SD and SDHC cards as well as Memory Sticks. Furthermore, Sony announced the release of its own line of SD cards. Many claimed this development as the end of the format war between Memory Stick and SD card. However, Sony did not abandon the format at this time, and indicated that it would continue development of the format for the foreseeable future. A prime example was the development of WiFi transfers through a special Memory Stick PRO-Duo which was still in development as of 2011.

Sony's first significant migration away from Memory Stick did not come until 2019, when it introduced the α7R IV full-frame mirrorless interchangeable-lens camera without Memory Stick support, opting instead for dual SDXC slots.

== Applications ==
Memory Sticks are typically used as storage media for a portable device, in a form which can easily be removed for access by a personal computer. For example, Sony digital compact cameras use Memory Stick for storing image files. With a Memory Stick-capable memory card reader, a user can copy the pictures taken with the Sony digital camera to a computer. Sony typically included Memory Stick reader hardware in its first-party consumer electronics, such as digital cameras, digital music players, PDAs, cellular phones, the VAIO line of laptop computers, TV sets under the WEGA and Bravia names, and Sony's handheld gaming device, the PlayStation Portable.

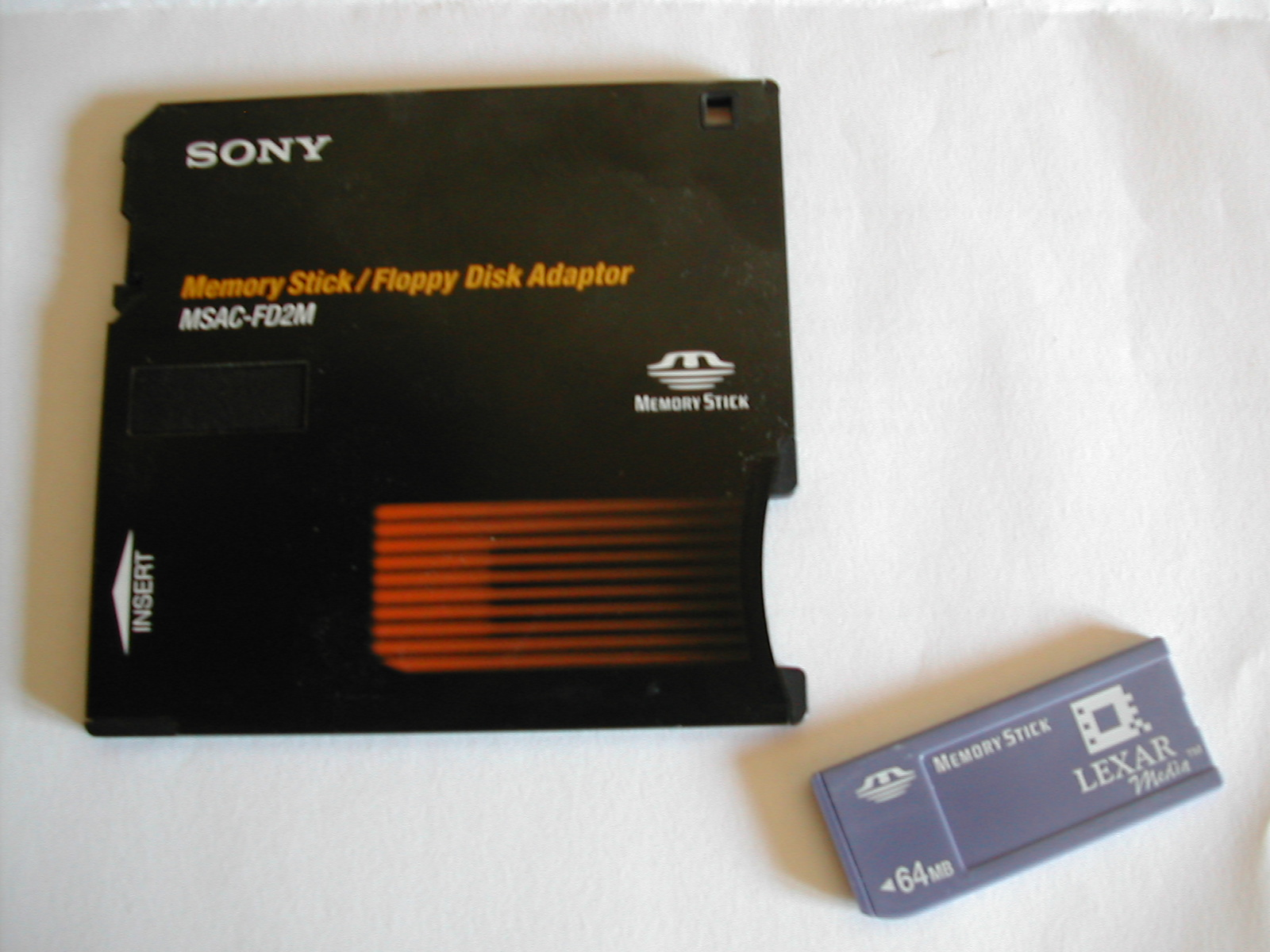
Memory Stick floppy disk adapter

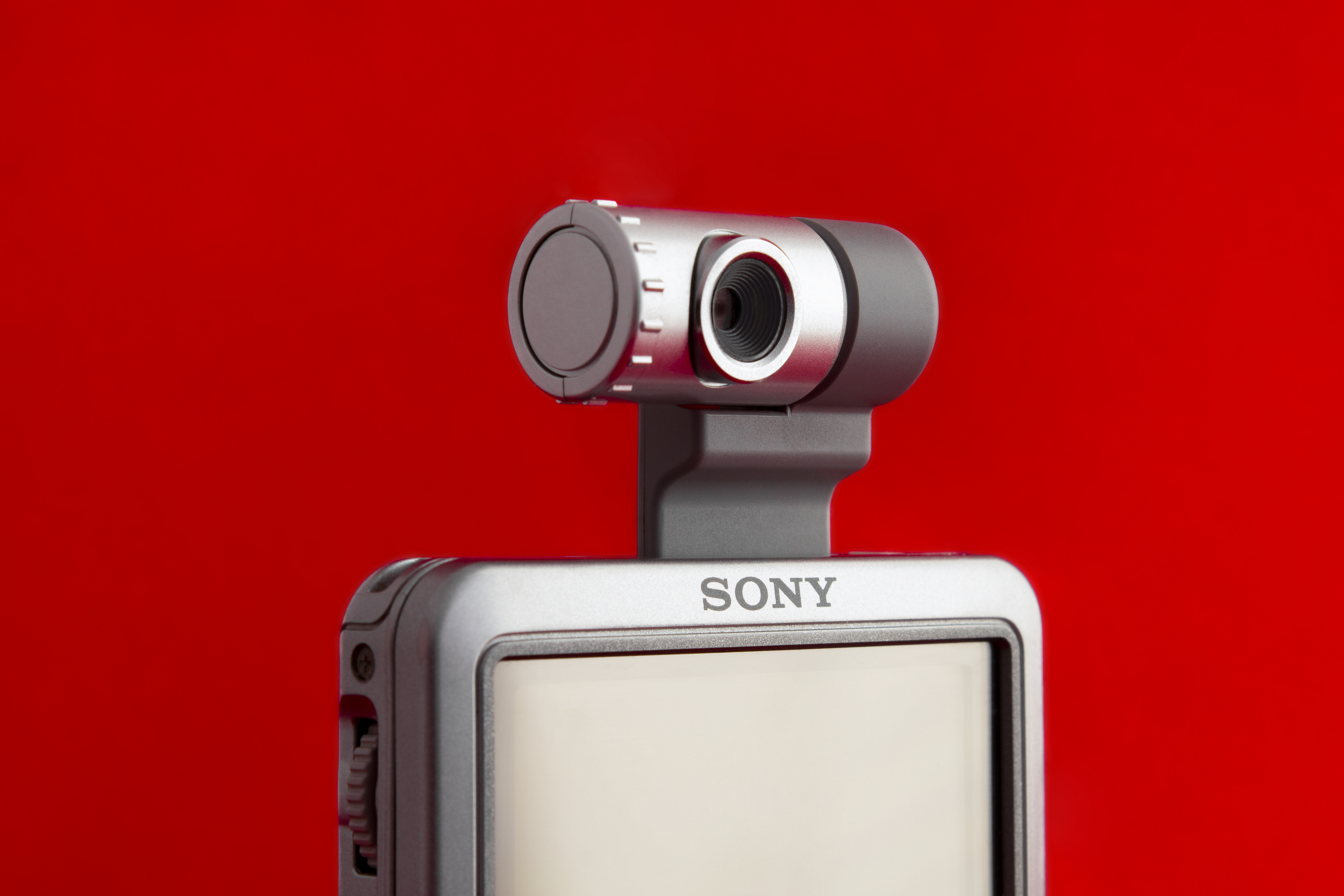
Sony PEGA-MSC1 digital camera connected to the Clié PEG-SJ20 via its Memory Stick slot

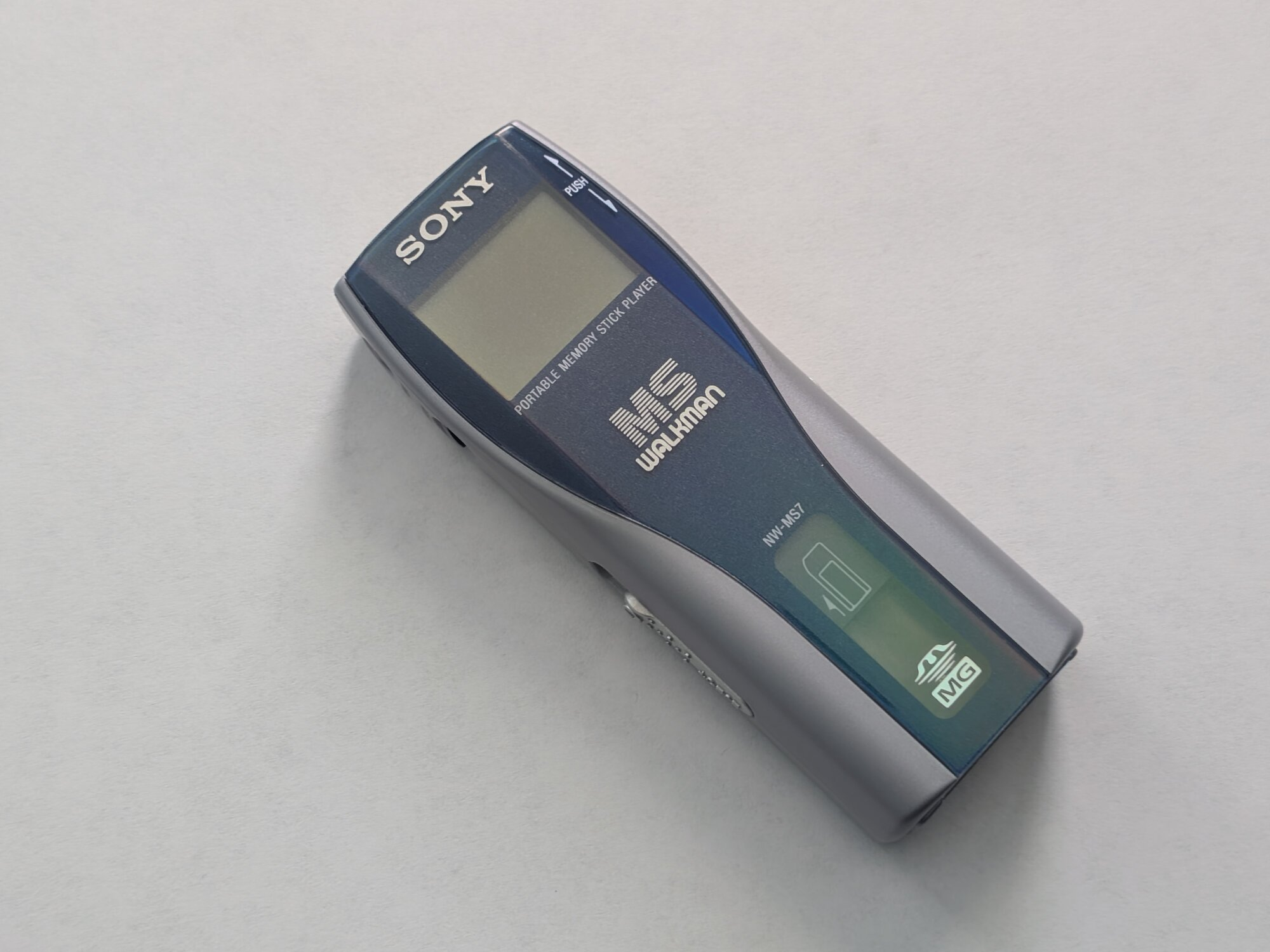
Sony MS Walkman (NW-MS7) digital audio player with inserted Memory Stick

A special Memory Stick can be inserted in the hindquarters of Sony's AIBO robot pet, to enable the use of Aiboware—software intended for use on AIBOs. The Sticks include a copy protection mechanism used by the robot, allowing users to write programs. These are referred to as programmable or programming. Only 8 MB and 16 MB versions are available.

An adapter was made for the original Memory Stick that allowed them to be used in later Sony Mavica models. This adapter, which took CR2016 cells for power, served a dual purpose of expanding storage capacity of the Mavica and giving those who did not have an existing Memory Stick drive a means of computer interfacing. With the Mavica FD92 and FD97, dedicated Memory Stick slots were added.

== Formats and form factors ==
Memory Sticks include a wide range of actual formats, including three different form factors.

=== Memory Stick ===
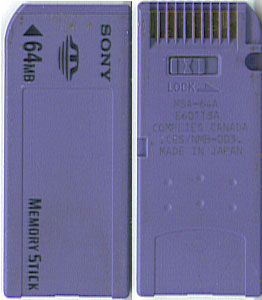
The original Memory Stick

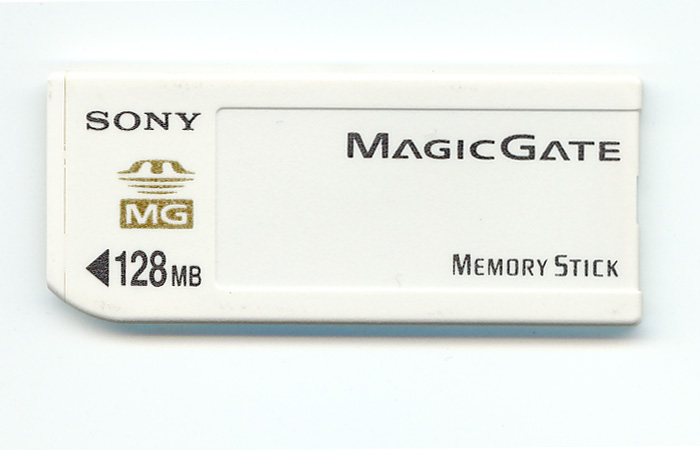
Sony Memory Stick with MagicGate

Introduced in July 1998, the original Memory Stick is approximately the size and thickness of a stick of chewing gum. It was available in capacities from 4 MB to 128 MB (1 MB = one million bytes). It was available both with and without MagicGate support. The MagicGate-capable memory sticks were white, while the standard version was purple. The original Memory Stick is no longer manufactured.

=== Memory Stick Select ===
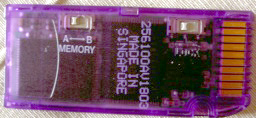
Lexar 256 MB Memory Stick Select with memory switch

In response to the storage limitations of the original Memory Stick, Sony introduced the Memory Stick Select at CES 2003 on January 9. The Memory Stick Select contained two separate 128 MB partitions which the user could switch between using a physical switch on the card. This solution was fairly unpopular, but it did give users of older Memory Stick devices more capacity. Its physical size remained the same as the original Memory Stick.

=== Memory Stick PRO ===
The Memory Stick PRO, introduced on January 9, 2003, as a joint effort between Sony and SanDisk, would be the longer-lasting solution to the space problem. Most devices that use the original Memory Sticks support the original and PRO sticks since both formats have identical form factors. Some readers that were not compatible could be upgraded to Memory Stick PRO support via a firmware update. Memory Stick PROs have a marginally higher transfer speed and a maximum theoretical capacity of 32 GB, (Note: In this article the unit symbol 'GB' is used to mean 1000^3 bytes (1 gigabyte)) although GB-sized capacities of more than 2GB are only available in the PRO Duo form factor. High Speed Memory Stick PROs are available, and newer devices support this high-speed mode, allowing for faster file transfers. All Memory Stick PROs larger than 1 GB support this high-speed mode, and High Speed Memory Stick PROs are backwards-compatible with devices that do not support the high-speed mode. High-capacity Memory Sticks such as the 4 GB versions are expensive compared to other types of flash memory like SD cards and CompactFlash. As of 2020, 512 MB Memory Stick PRO can be bought.

=== Memory Stick Duo ===
Introduced in July 2002, the Memory Stick Duo was developed in response to Sony's need for a smaller flash memory card for pocket-sized digital cameras, cell phones and the PlayStation Portable (the latter of which supported the Memory Stick PRO Duo variant). It is slightly smaller than the competing Secure Digital (SD) format and roughly two thirds the length of the standard Memory Stick form factor, but costs more. Memory Stick Duos are available with the same features as the larger standard Memory Stick, obtainable with and without high speed mode, and with and without MagicGate support. The Memory Stick PRO Duo has replaced the Memory Stick Duo due to its 128 MB size limitation, but has kept the same form factor as the Duo.

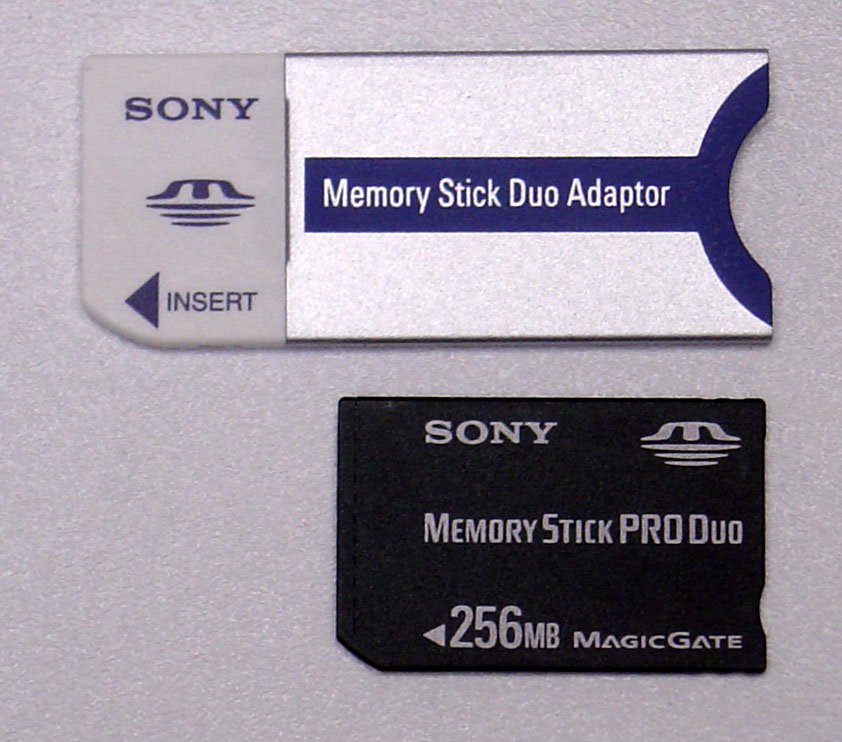
Memory Stick Duo Adaptor and Memory Stick PRO Duo

A simple adapter allows Memory Stick Duo to be used in devices designed to accept the original Memory Stick form factor.

=== Memory Stick PRO Duo ===
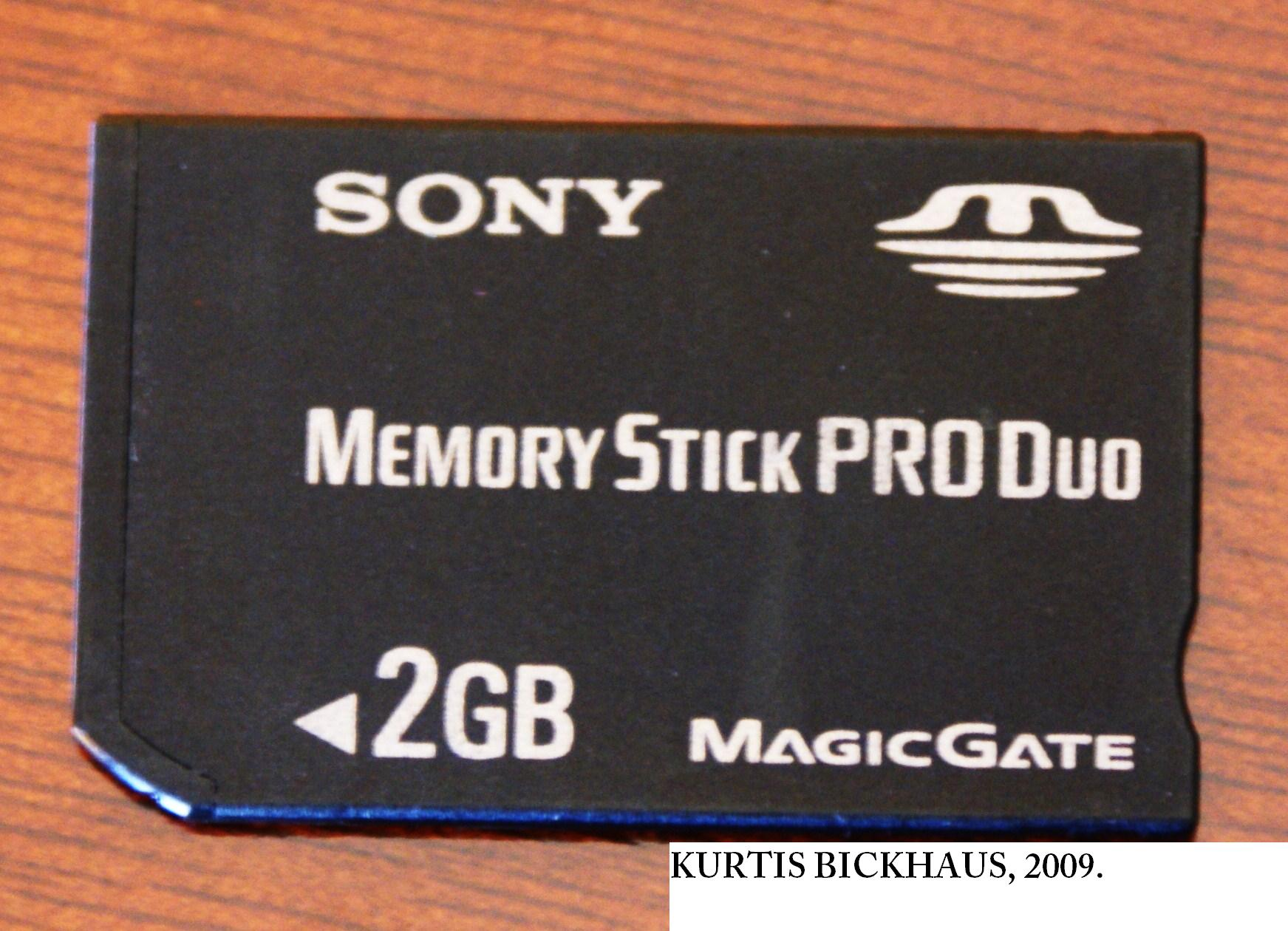
A Sony Memory Stick PRO Duo (2 GB)

The Memory Stick PRO Duo (MSPD) quickly replaced the Memory Stick Duo due to the size limitation of 128 MB and slow transfer speed. Memory Stick PRO Duos are available in all the same variants as the larger Memory Stick PRO, with and without High Speed mode, and with and without MagicGate support.

Sony has released different versions of Memory Stick PRO Duo. A Memory Stick PRO Duo with MagicGate was released as a 512 MB stick. Additionally, a 16 GB version in March 2008 and another a 32 GB version on August 21, 2009. In 2009, Sony and SanDisk also announced the joint development of an expanded Memory Stick PRO format tentatively named "Memory Stick PRO Format for Extended High Capacity". Sony has since finalized the format and released its specification under the new name, Memory Stick XC (see below).

There exist adapters for those who want to use microSD cards, on devices which only support Memory Stick PRO Duo cards, that allows usage of the storage on a microSD for files on the device in question.

=== Memory Stick PRO-HG Duo ===
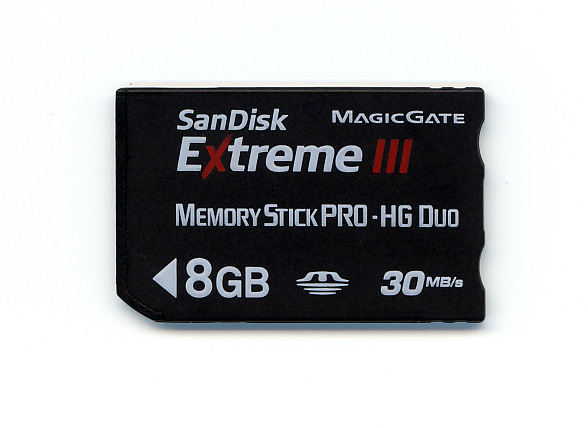
PRO-HG Duo (8 GB)

On December 11, 2006, Sony, together with SanDisk, announced the Memory Stick PRO-HG Duo. While only serial and 4-bit parallel interfaces are supported in the Memory Stick PRO format, an 8-bit parallel interface was added to the Memory Stick PRO-HG format. The maximum interface clock frequency was also increased from 40 MHz to 60 MHz. With these enhancements, a theoretical transfer rate of 480 Mbit/s (60 MB/s) is achieved, which is three times faster than the Memory Stick PRO format.

=== Memory Stick Micro (M2) ===
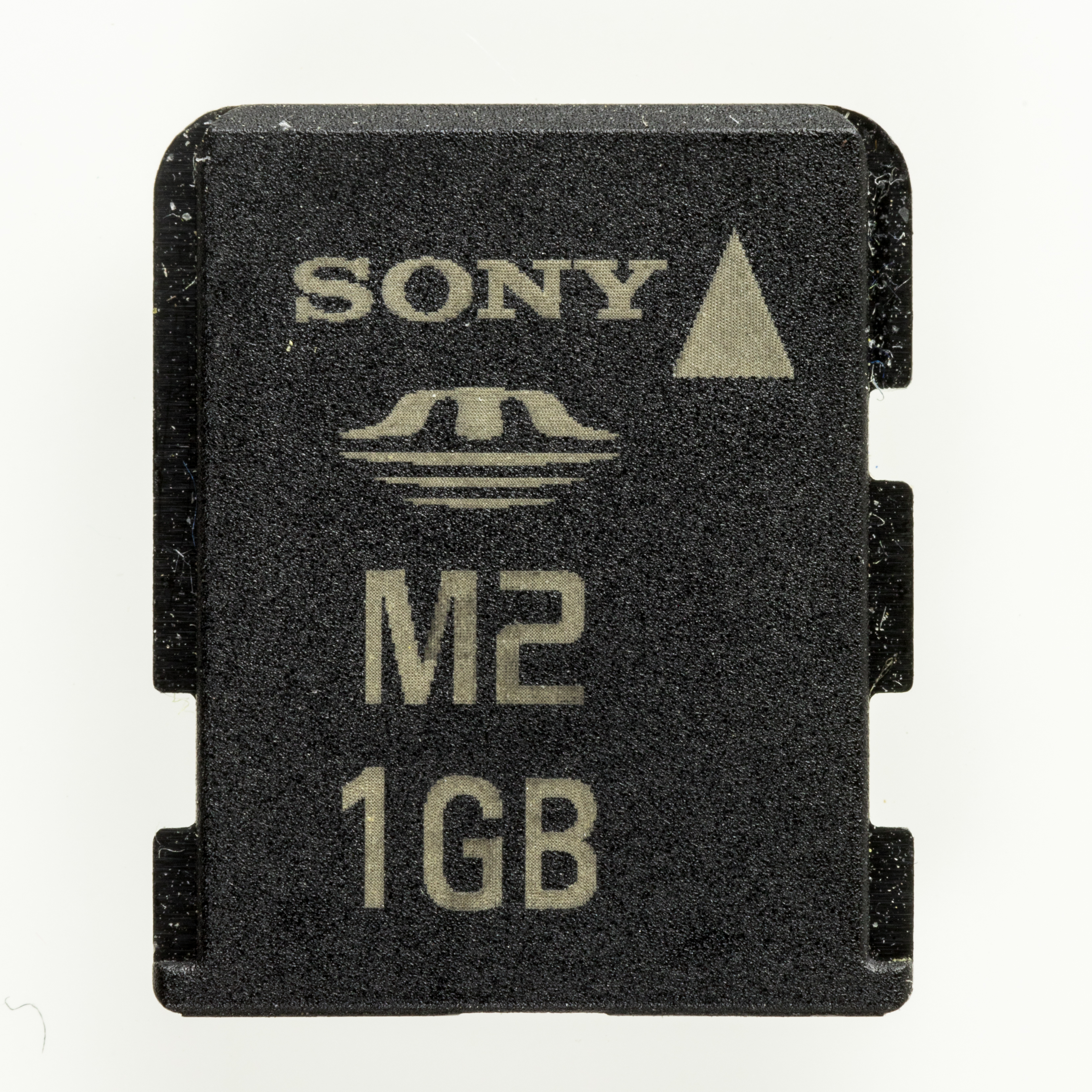
Memory Stick Micro

In a joint venture with SanDisk, Sony released a new Memory Stick format on February 6, 2006. The Memory Stick Micro (M2) measures 15 × 12.5 × 1.2 mm (roughly one-quarter the size of the Duo) with 64 MB, 128 MB, 256 MB, 512 MB, 1 GB, 2 GB, 4 GB, 8 GB, and 16 GB capacities available. The format has a theoretical limit of 32 GB and maximum transfer speed of 160 Mbit/s. However, as with the PRO Duo format, it has been expanded through the XC series as Memory Stick XC Micro and Memory Stick XC-HG Micro, both with the theoretical maximum capacity of 2 TB. (Note: In this article the unit symbol 'TB' is used to mean 1000^4 bytes (1 terabyte))

The M2 comes with an adapter, much like the Duo Sticks, to ensure physical compatibility with Memory Stick PRO devices. However, not all devices with a PRO slot are compatible with the M2/Adapter combination, as the firmware of older devices do not support the higher capacity of some M2 cards. One example is certain Sony CLIÉ PDAs which do not support cards larger than 2 GB.

Sony announced on June 1, 2009, that M2 support in Sony Ericsson phones would be dropped in favor of microSD.

The Sony DSC-RX0 Mark II made a revived usage of M2 slots.

=== Memory Stick XC ===
On January 7, 2009, SanDisk and Sony announced the Memory Stick XC format (tentatively named "Memory Stick Format Series for Extended High Capacity" at the time). The Memory Stick XC has a maximum theoretical 2 TB capacity, 64 times larger than that of the Memory Stick PRO Duo which is limited to 32 GB. XC series has the same form factors as PRO series, and supports MagicGate content protection technology as well as Access Control function as PRO series does. In line with the rest of the industry, the XC series uses the newer exFAT file system due to size and formatting limitations of FAT/FAT16/FAT32 filesystems used in the PRO series. A maximum transfer speed of 480 Mbit/s (60 Mbyte/s) is achieved through 8-bit parallel data transfer. No Memory Stick XC cards were released to the market, likely due to the dominance of SD cards. Its equivalent is named SDXC and eventually became more successful than any other exFAT-based memory card format.

=== Memory Stick PRO-HG Duo HX ===
Sony announced the release of the Memory Stick PRO-HG Duo HX on May 17, 2011, which was considered the fastest card ever made by the manufacturer. It measures 20 × 31 × 1.6 mm, with 8 GB, 16 GB, or 32 GB versions available. The format also offers a maximum transfer speed of 50 MB/s.

== Mark 2 certification ==
As of early 2008, Mark 2-certified versions of the Memory Stick PRO Duo became available. The Mark 2 designation indicates the Memory Stick is suitable for use with AVCHD recording products or other faster Memory Stick enabled devices by providing appropriate minimum write performance.

== See also ==
- Comparison of memory cards
- Format war
- MultiMediaCard
- SmartMedia Card
- SxS
- xD Picture Card
- USB flash drive
