= Pad =

Pad or pads may refer to:

== Wearables ==
- Pads, protective equipment used in baseball, cricket, and hockey
  - Elbow pad
  - Knee pad
  - Shoulder pads (sport)
- Menstrual pad, used to absorb menstrual or other vaginal blood
- Incontinence pad, worn to absorb involuntarily expelled bodily fluids
- Shoulder pads (fashion), fabric-covered padding in clothing
- Cycling pad, found in cycling shorts, pants and tights

== Computing and electronics ==
=== Input devices ===
- Gamepad, joypad, or controller, an input device used in gaming
- Graphics pad, a computer input device
- Keypad, buttons arranged in a block
- Touchpad or trackpad, a pointing device featuring a tactile sensor
- Trigger pad, an electronic sensor on a drum

=== Other hardware ===
- Contact pad, the designated surface area for an electrical contact
- A resistive pad used in an attenuator
- An electronic notebook
- A tablet computer
- GridPad, the first commercially successful tablet computer
- iPad, a tablet computer made by Apple
- ThinkPad, a laptop brand first designed and produced by IBM, but now owned by Lenovo
- WatchPad, discontinued IBM smartwatch line
- WorkPad, discontinued line of PDA, branded by IBM

=== Other uses in computing and electronics ===
- One-time pad, a method of cryptography

== Transportation ==
- Brake pad, part of a drum brake
- Launch pad, an area where spacecraft start flight
- Helicopter landing pad
- Roll way or running pad, placed along the rails of metro or tram tracks

== Music ==
- Pad, some holes of woodwind instruments (clarinets, saxophones...) are closed by air-tight pads.
- Soft, mellow timbres generated by synthesisers are often called pads, and are generally used as backing sounds.

== Other uses ==
- Part of a mammal's paw
- Pad, Roane County, West Virginia
- A paper notebook
- San Diego Padres, a Major League Baseball team nicknamed the "Pads"

== See also ==
- PADS (disambiguation)
- PAD (disambiguation)
- PADD
- Padding (disambiguation)
