= ThinkPad 220 =

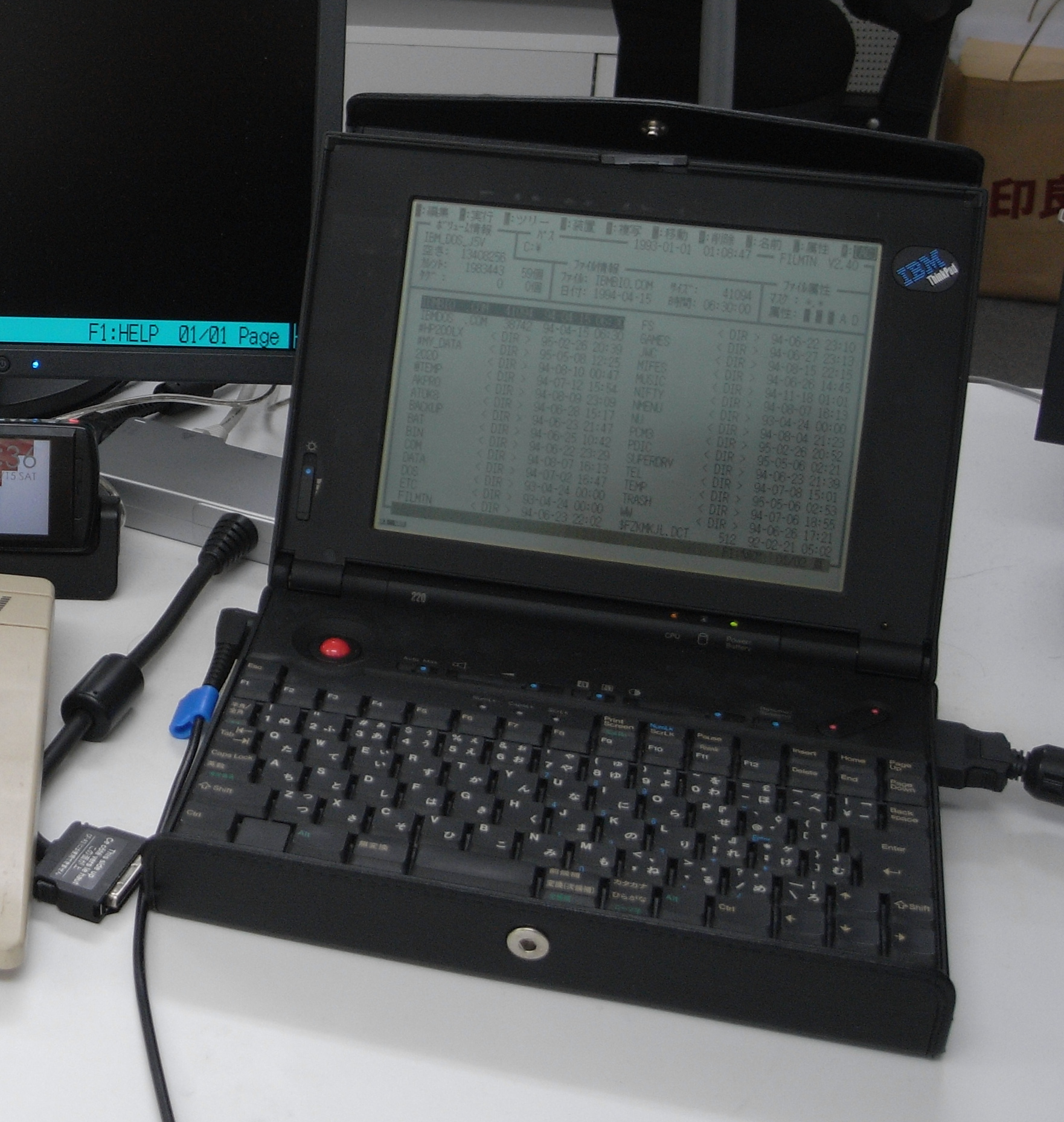
ThinkPad 220 (in sleeve case)

The IBM ThinkPad 220 is a subnotebook from the ThinkPad line by IBM. It was released in Japan only in 1993, and was jointly developed by IBM Japan Yamato Facility and IBM Japan and Ricoh joint project Rios System.

The 220 shares its 'Monolith' architecture and styling directly with its 200 predecessor, also known as the "Monolith" prototype along with its 230Cs successor and the Palm Top PC110.

== Specifications ==
It is based on an Intel 386, has 2MB RAM and a 80MB disk, 6-row keyboard and trackball, and weighed 1kg. The machine was originally supplied in a neat leather IBM wallet with 'Mobile Computing' recessed into the front.

The backlit greyscale LCD display is difficult to read compared to the subsequent color DSTN machines.

== Successor ==
The successor was the ThinkPad 230Cs with 7-row keyboard, trackpoint and weighed 1.7kg, released in 1994.

== See also ==
- IBM Palm Top PC 110
