= PAD =

PAD may refer to:

== Media and entertainment ==
- Peter Allen David (1956–2025), American writer
- Poker After Dark, a poker television show
- Puzzle & Dragons, a 2012 Japanese mobile game

== Military ==
- Pontoon Assembly Detachment, of the U.S. Navy Seabees
- Prithvi Air Defence, a missile

== Organizations ==
- Pädagogischer Austauschdienst, a German scholastic exchange service
- Pakistan Association of the Deaf, a Pakistani organisation representing deaf people
- Pakistan Association Dubai, a Pakistani expatriate organisation
- People's Action for Development, an Indian NGO
- People's Alliance for Democracy, a political group in Thailand
- Phi Alpha Delta, a North American fraternity
- Propaganda and Agitation Department, of the Central Committee of the Workers' Party of Korea

== Science and technology ==
=== Computing ===
- Packet assembler/disassembler, a communications device
- PAD, a C1 control code used for padding
- Portable Application Description, a document format
- Program-associated data, a type of broadcast information

=== Medicine and psychology ===
- PAD emotional state model, a psychological model based on pleasure, arousal and dominance
- Peripheral artery disease, a vascular disease that causes ulcers (wounds) to develop on the legs and feet

== Transportation ==
- London Paddington station (station code: PAD), England
- Paderborn Lippstadt Airport (IATA code: PAD), Germany

== Other uses ==
- Pre-authorized debit, a financial transaction

== See also ==
- Pad (disambiguation)
- PADS (disambiguation)
- Pad (disambiguation)
