= IBM Palm Top PC 110 =

Handheld personal computer by IBM

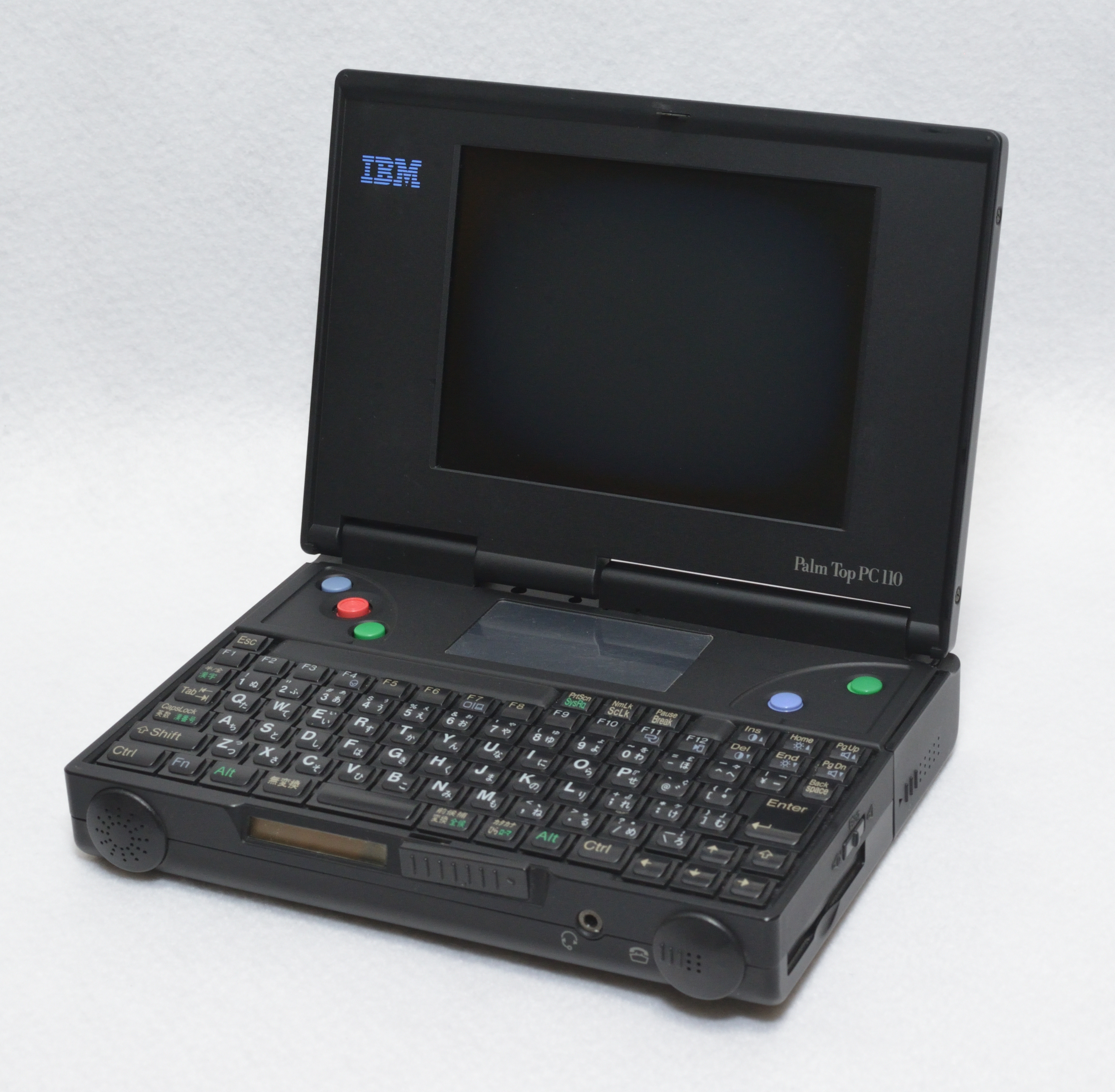
- Manufacturer: IBM
- Type: Palmtop computer
- Released: September 1995; 31 years ago
- Introductory price: Starting at JP¥169,000 US$1,533 (equivalent to $3,239 in 2025)
- Operating system: IBM DOS 7.0; Windows 3.1; Windows 95
- CPU: Intel 80486SX at 33 MHz
- Memory: 4–20 MB
- Weight: 630 g (1.39 lb)
- Website: ibm.com at the Wayback Machine (archived 2001-04-18)

The Palm Top PC 110 is a palmtop computer that was developed jointly by IBM's Japanese subsidiary and Ricoh. It was released exclusively in Japan in September 1995. It used the Intel 80486SX microprocessor and was available in three different configurations. It used a Japanese keyboard, could be used in a docking station, and had a modem connection. During the development phase, the size was decreased. After the release, it was received positively for the number of features, but negatively for the small keyboard.

== Specifications ==
The Palm Top PC 110 measured 158 by 133 by 33 mm (6.2 by 5.2 by 1.3 in). Despite the chassis being constructed out of duralumin, the PC 110 weighed 630 g (1.39 lb) with the battery inserted. Unlike other handheld PCs in its range, the battery of the PC 110 was a standard 7.2 V lithium-ion pack (NP500 series) commonly used by Video8 camcorders manufactured by companies such as Sony and Panasonic. The 89-key keyboard was laid out in the JIS (Japanese Industrial Standards) format for the Japanese market. Above it is a small digitizer that allows the user to make handwritten notes on the computer with a stylus or ballpoint pen. On both sides of the digitizer are mouse buttons for left- and right-clicking. IBM provided only one TrackPoint pointing stick, however, on the left side.

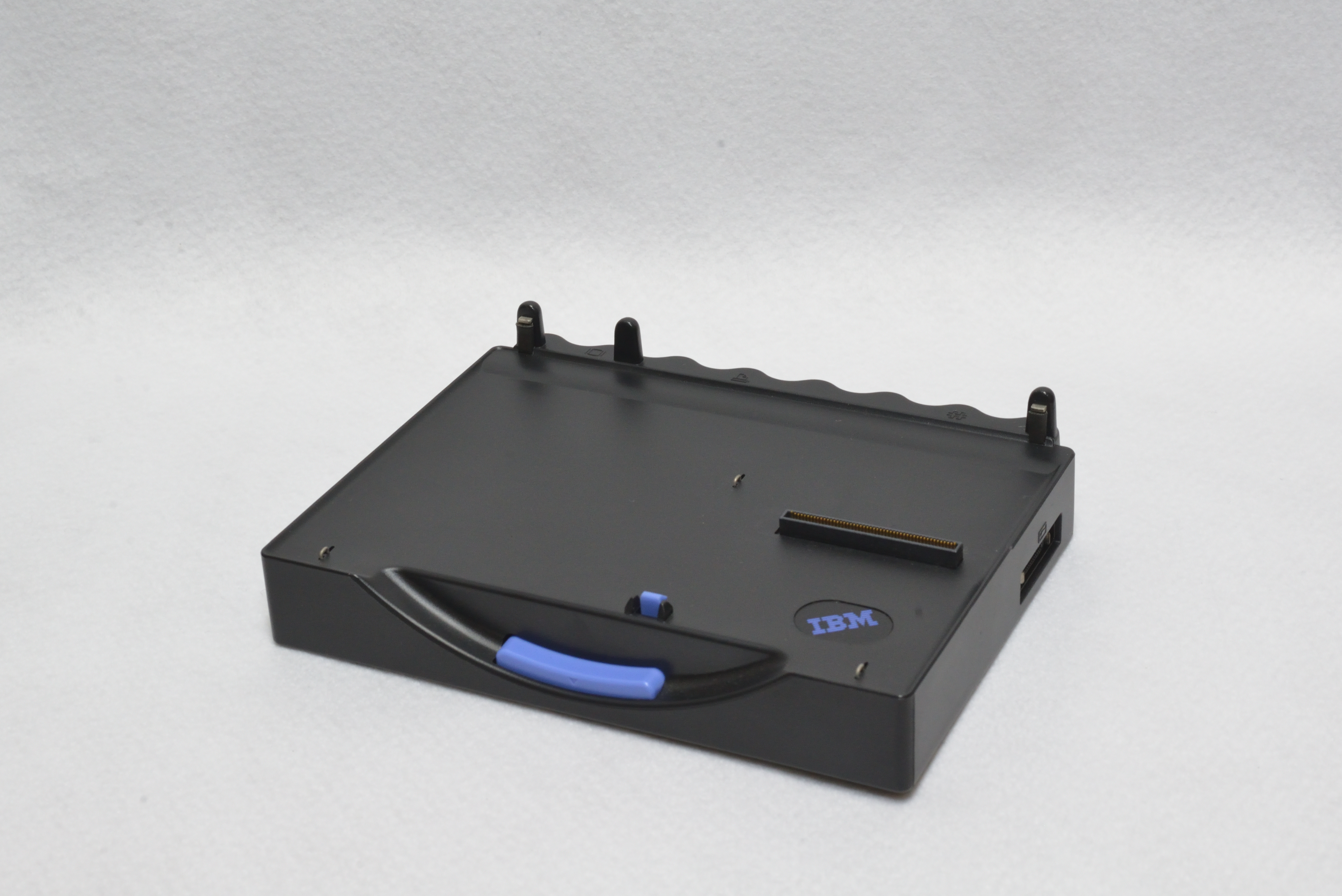
The Palm Top PC 110's docking station

Two PC Card slots, both Type I and II—the two could be combined into one Type III slot for cards occupying both slots—were put on the main unit. IBM offered an expansion dock that added the standard suite of ports for the time, including those for keyboard, mouse, parallel and serial. As the PC 110 lacks an internal 3.5 in floppy disk drive, IBM offered an external drive; however, this drive could only be inserted into the optional expansion dock.

The PC 110 ran on the Intel 486SX which was based on the i486 that was released in 1989, with a clock speed of 33 MHz. The dual-scan passive-matrix LCD measured 4.7 inches (11.9 cm) diagonally with a resolution of 640 × 480 and was capable of displaying 256 colors. The Chips and Technologies 65535 display controller supported a resolution of 800 × 600 with 16 colors when supplied an external monitor. In lieu of a traditional hard disk drive, the PC 110 contained 4 MB of flash memory, preinstalled with the Japanese version of PC DOS 7.0 and Personaware, a basic graphical operating system developed by IBM Japan exclusively for the PC 110. In addition to this internal flash chip, the PC 110 included one Compact Flash card slot for external storage.

IBM offered the PC 110 in three configurations. The first and least expensive configuration supplied 4 MB of RAM, while the last two doubled that amount. The last and most expensive configuration supplied a 260 MB hard drive with a Type III PC Card header that occupied both PC Card slots in the unit. Manufactured by Intégral Peripherals, this hard drive initially came preinstalled with the Japanese version of Windows 3.1; IBM later configured it with Windows 95.

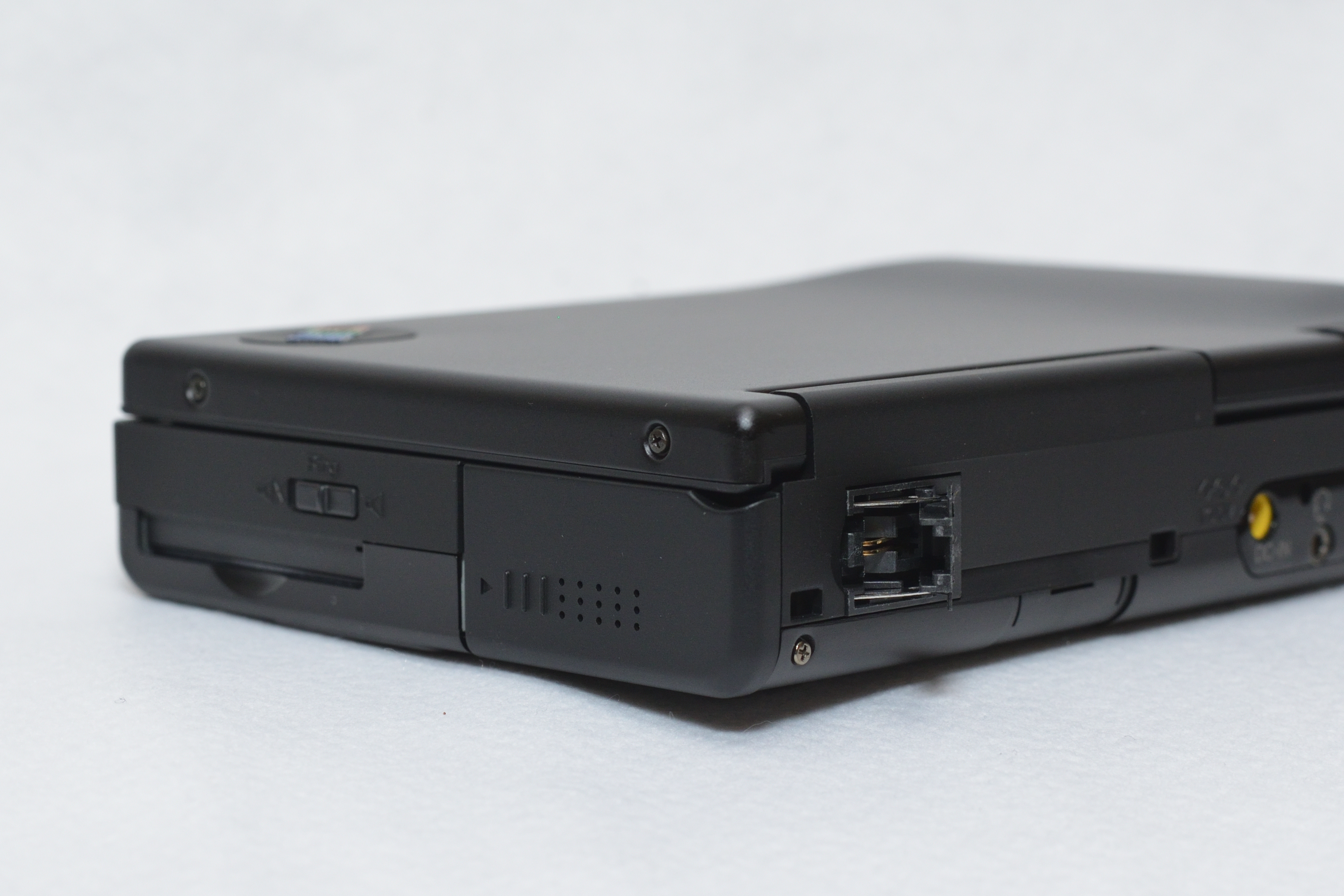
The swing-out modem jack

The PC 110 came equipped with a speaker and microphone, both powered by a Sound Blaster-compatible chip. It also had a built-in voice–data modem with a swing-out modem jack engineered jointly by IBM, Ricoh and Hosiden. This modem supported voice communication with the PC 110's speaker and microphone, which could be repurposed as a receiver and transmitter respectively, effectively turning the PC 110 into a handset. Voice communication could also be achieved via headset. To add to its multimedia capabilities, IBM commissioned Canon to manufacture an optional webcam that connects to the PC 110 via the PC Card slot.

== Development ==
IBM Japan commissioned optical imaging company Ricoh to co-develop the Palm Top PC 110, with Tetsuya Kaku (ja) as its chief engineer. The PC 110 was designed to be a successor to their popular ThinkPad 200 subnotebook line. The first prototypes were roughly the size of a VHS cassette. The engineers soon adjusted the case to be much narrower and thicker both because they observed testers using their thumbs to type with the built-in keyboard and to accommodate the size of the camcorder battery used to power the machine when not plugged in. The process of miniaturizing each component in the computer meant that the cost of production was relatively high for handheld PCs in its class. Kaku and company strove to reuse parts where possible; for example, the 4.7 in screen was the same panel used in color-capable GPS receivers of its day. A version of the PC 110 with a CT2-capable cellular modem was planned but never released.

== Marketing and reception ==
Unlike even the smallest subnotebook, a machine this light and little almost begs you to take it everywhere, if only to turn heads when you open it up.

— Stephen Manes, in The New York Times

The PC 110 was released exclusively in Japan in September 1995. In Japan, IBM used the tokusatsu superhero character Ultraman under license from Tsuburaya as an advertising mascot for the Palm Top PC 110.

While the Palm Top PC 110 was lauded for integrating many features in such a small package, the compact layout of the keyboard as well as the minuscule size of its individual keys was poorly received by both Japanese users and Western journalists. Steven Myers for Computing Japan called it "difficult to use unless the unit is lying flat on a table—and virtually impossible to use while standing." Stephen Manes in The New York Times agreed, though he was able to invent some "halfway-decent" hunt-and-peck typing styles with practice—allowing him to write his review on the PC 110 itself. Aside from this, reviewers were generally impressed with the capability the manufacturers were able to squeeze in such a small package. Myers praised the high resolution and readability of the LCD, especially in comparison to the monochrome displays featured in contemporaneous handheld devices such as the Sharp Zaurus. For Manes, the fact that the PC 110 was fundamentally compatible with IBM PC software including Windows positioned it firmly ahead of the competition from Sharp and Psion, though the 486SX processor ran newer software slowly. Manes recommended IBM incorporate the "butterfly keyboard" mechanism of the ThinkPad 701 and that they add an additional PC Card slot in the main unit to allow for further expansion when the PC Card hard drive is installed.

IBM silently discontinued the PC 110 in 1999 with the release of the WorkPad Z50, a Windows CE-powered handheld PC. Celebrating the 10th anniversary of the ThinkPad brand in 2002, Hideo Ishii of PC Watch called the PC 110 "ahead of its time".

== Timeline ==
Timeline of the IBM Personal Computer

Asterisk (*) denotes a model released in Japan only

== See also ==
- PC Open Architecture Developers' Group
