= Padding (disambiguation) =

Padding is a soft material used for the sake of comfort or to change the shape of something.

Padding may also refer to:

- Schedule padding, time added to a transportation schedule making it resilient to delay
- Padding argument, method of proving that some complexity classes are conditionally equal
- Padding (cryptography), increasing the length of a message prior to encryption so that its actual length is not disclosed
- Resume padding, fluff added to a resume

== Computing ==
- Data structure alignment, achieved by "padding" data structures with unused bytes
- File padding, the practice of adding junk or dummy data to a file or a storage medium to fill up space
- Output padding, non-printing characters used after control sequences

=== Output formatting ===
- Cellpadding, or cell padding, in HTML and CSS languages, the amount of space between the border of a table cell and its contents (margin in a cell)
- HTML padding, an HTML attribute used to space between the text and the border
- CSS padding, a type of spacing used to lay out websites

== See also ==
- Pad (disambiguation)
