= Pad, West Virginia =

Pad
- Ghost town
- Location within the state of West Virginia
- Coordinates: 38°38′31″N 81°20′6″W
- Country: United States
- State: West Virginia
- County: Roane
- Elevation: 794 ft (242 m)
- Time zone: UTC-5 (Eastern (EST))
  - Summer (DST): UTC-4 (EDT)
- GNIS ID: 1740965

Pad is an extinct town in Roane County, West Virginia.

The community took its name from nearby Pad Fork creek.
