= Palm V =

Personal digital assistant by 3Com

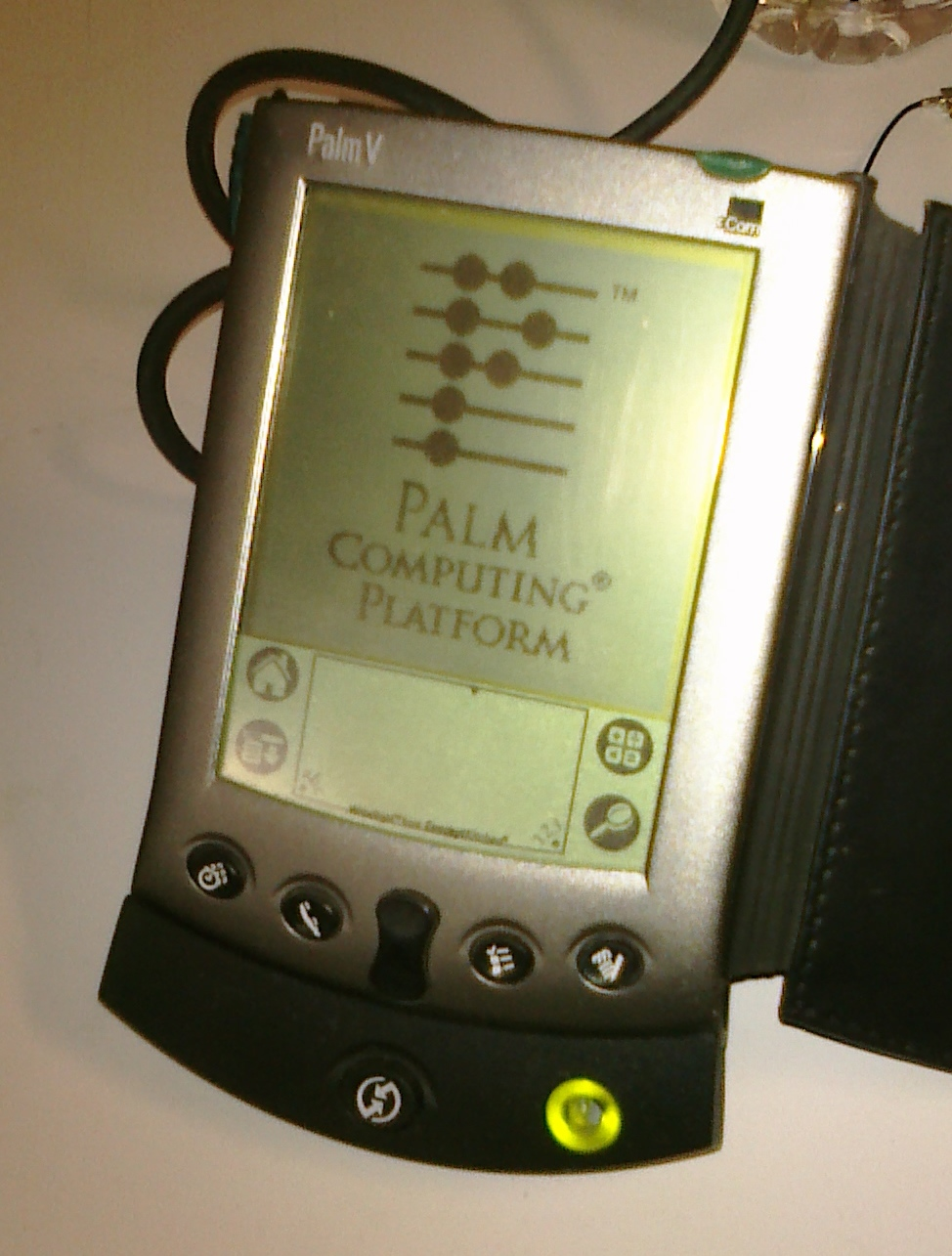
- Palm V in its dock
- Developer: 3Com
- Product family: Palm
- Type: Personal digital assistant
- Released: 1999
- Operating system: Palm OS 3.0
- CPU: Dragonball EZ
- Memory: 2 MB
- Display: Backlit; 16-shade grayscale
- Connectivity: Serial port (EIA-232-D); Consumer IR
- Power: Lithium-ion battery
- Dimensions: 4.5 in (110 mm) tall; <0.5 in (13 mm) thick
- Weight: 4 ounces (110 g)
- Predecessor: Palm III family

The Palm V is a personal digital assistant (PDA) by 3Com.

Released in 1999 by 3Com, the four-ounce (110 g) PDA has an aluminum enclosure containing a Dragonball EZ (a central processing unit capable of overclocking to 39 megahertz) and two megabytes of memory. Measuring 4.5 inches (110 mm) tall and less than 0.5 inches (13 mm) thick, the device's 16-shade grayscale display has a backlight and increased resolution from the previous-generation Palm III. Unlike that older device, which uses disposable batteries (AAAs), the Palm V has a built-in lithium-ion battery, which can be recharged, with an expected charge lasting 1–2 weeks. Palm Vs are equipped with a serial port that is electrically though not physically compatible with the EIA-232-D telecommunications standard (the redesigned enclosure design prevents Palm III-compatible accessories from connecting to the port) and a Consumer IR transceiver.

Upon launch, the Palm V cost about US$500 (equivalent to about $970 in 2025), though it had reduced to $300–400 by January 2000 (equivalent to about $560–750 in 2025). Units sold in late 1999 came pre-loaded with version 3.0 of Palm OS, though 3.3 was available to download and install. The IBM WorkPad c3 is the Palm V, relabeled.

Ars Technica's Will Smith raved about his Palm V in 1999, recommending it to all interested, excepting Palm III users for whom the technical-specifications upgrade was not substantial enough. Writing for TechRepublic in January 2000, Jeff Thompson was enthusiastically full of praise for the Palm V, both for personal and enterprise uses.

== Vx ==
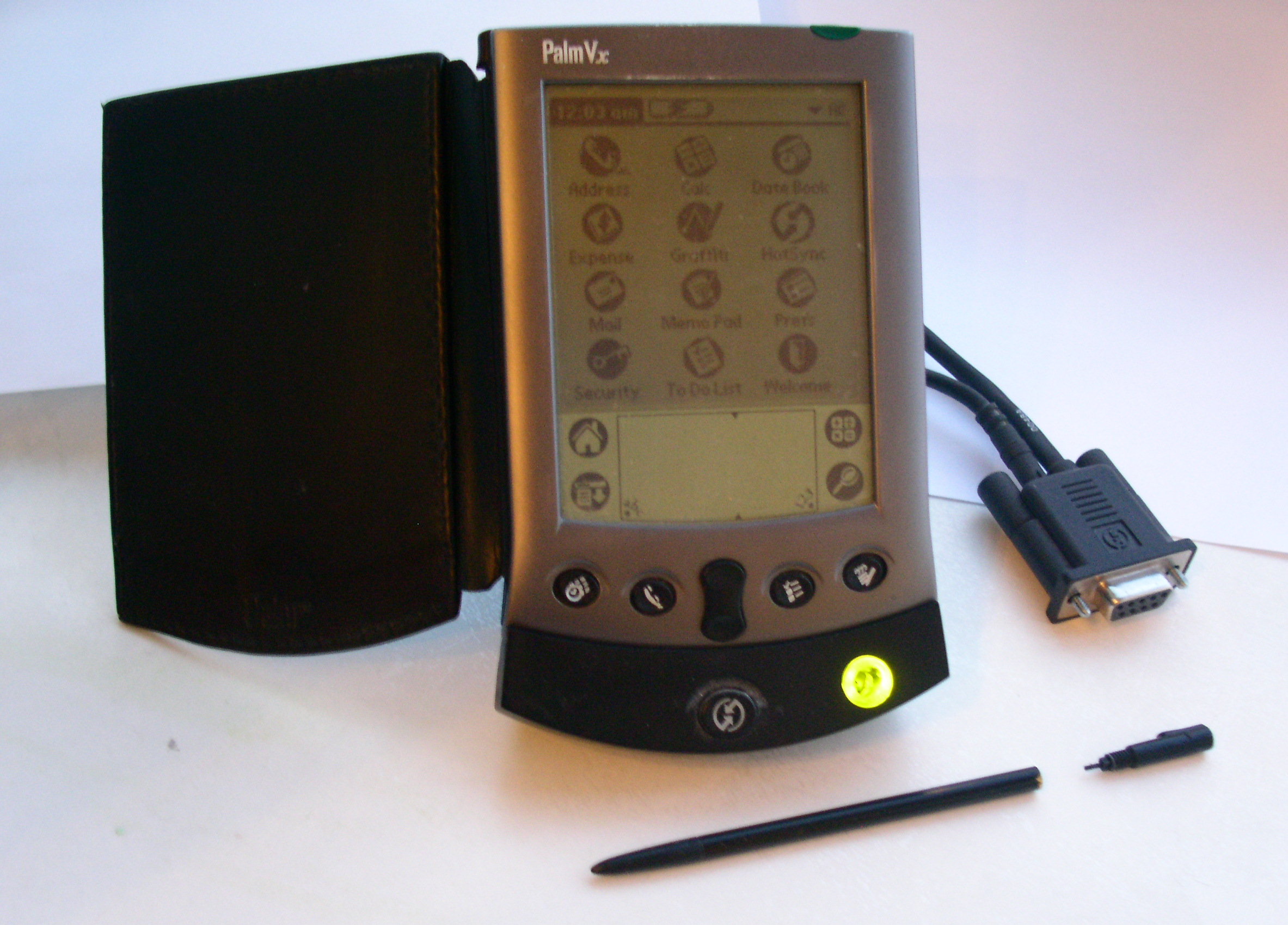
A Palm Vx

On October 4, 1999, 3Com released the Palm Vx. Measuring 11.5 by 8 by 1 centimetre (4.53 by 3.15 by 0.39 in) and weighing 114 grams (4.0 oz), the new product featured an improved eight megabytes of memory storage and faster PC synchronization. The list price was US$449 (equivalent to $867.77 in 2025).

In 2000, 3Com partnered with supermodel Claudia Schiffer to release the Palm Vx Claudia Schiffer Edition on August 1: it features a "blue brushed-metal" exterior rather than the base silver color, and was sold exclusively through Schiffer's website.

== See also ==
- Graffiti (Palm OS) – Shorthand input system for Palm OS
