= PC World =

American global computer magazine

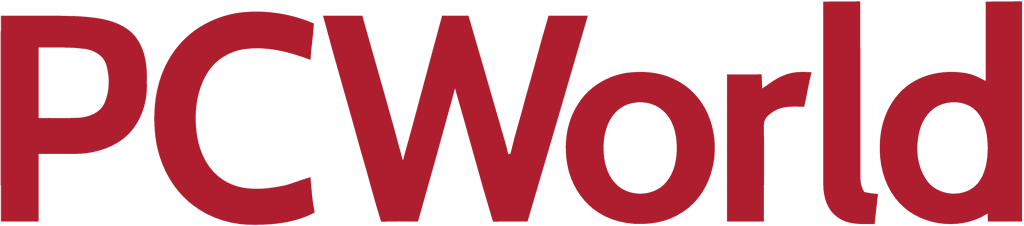
- Editorial Director: Jon Phillips
- Categories: Computer magazine
- Frequency: Monthly
- Total circulation: 355,117 (United States) (December 2012)
- First issue: March 1983; 43 years ago
- Final issue: August 2013 (print)
- Company: FoundryCo, Inc. (Regent LP)
- Country: United States
- Based in: San Francisco, California, US
- Language: English
- Website: pcworld.com
- ISSN: 0737-8939
- OCLC: 1117065657

PC World (stylized as PCWorld) is a global computer magazine published monthly by Foundry. Since 2013, it has been an online-only publication, with a monthly digital edition and a continuously updated website.

It offers advice on various aspects of PCs and related items, the Internet, and other personal technology products and services. In each publication, PC World reviews and tests hardware and software products from a variety of manufacturers, as well as other technology related devices such as still and video cameras, audio devices and televisions.

The current editorial director of PC World is Jon Phillips, formerly of Wired. In August 2012, he replaced Steve Fox, who had been editorial director since the December 2008 issue of the magazine. Fox replaced the magazine's veteran editor Harry McCracken, who resigned that spring, after some rocky times, including quitting and being rehired over editorial control issues in 2007.

PC World is published under other names such as PC Advisor and PC Welt in some countries. Some of the non-English PC World websites now redirect to other FoundryCo sites; for example, PCWorld.dk (Denmark) is now Computerworld.dk

== History ==
The publication was announced at the COMDEX trade show in November 1982, and first appeared on newsstands in March 1983.

The magazine was founded by David Bunnell and Cheryl Woodard, and its first editor was Andrew Fluegelman. PC World's magazine and web site have won a number of awards from Folio, the American Society of Business Publication Editors, MIN, the Western Publications Association, and other organizations; it is also one of the few technology magazines to have been a finalist for a National Magazine Award.

Many well known technology writers have contributed to PC World, including Steve Bass, Daniel Tynan, Christina Wood, John C. Dvorak, Stephen Manes, Lincoln Spector, Stewart Alsop, David Coursey, James A. Martin, and others. Editorial leadership has included Harry Miller, Richard Landry, Eric Knorr, Karl Koessel, Phil Lemmons, Cathryn Baskin, Kevin McKean, and Harry McCracken.

In February 1999, PC World's number of paid subscriptions reached a record of 1,000,453. At the time, it was the first and only computing magazine with a monthly release schedule to hit that mark. In April 2005, the show Digital Duo was slightly rebranded and relaunched as PC World's Digital Duo, and ran for an additional 26 episodes. As of 2006, PC World's audited rate base of 750,000 made it the largest circulation computing magazine in the world.

On July 10, 2013, owner IDG announced that the magazine would cease its thirty-year print run. The issue of August 2013 was the last printed of the magazine PC World, future issues would be digital only.

In December 2024, PCWorld expanded its coverage of personal tech by forming a more formal bond between PCWorld and sister site TechHive, which had been covering smart home and video streaming tech since 2017.

In March 2025, PCWorld's parent company, Foundry, was acquired from IDG/Blackstone by Regent LP.

== Countries ==
Based in San Francisco, PC World's original edition is published in the United States; however it is also available in other countries (51 in total), sometimes under a different name:

- PC World in Albania, Australia, Bangladesh, Bulgaria, Brazil, Denmark, Greece, India (from July 2006), Kosovo, New Zealand, Norway, Philippines, Poland, Spain, Romania, Russia, Turkey, Vietnam, Ecuador.
- PC Advisor in Ireland and the United Kingdom, which stopped publication in 2017 (Another now discontinued magazine called Personal Computer World and a PC World retailer — neither related to the PC World magazine — already exist or existed in those markets.)
- PC Welt, is the German language edition.
- PCW, is the Hungarian language edition.
- Info Komputer, is the Indonesian language edition.
- Kompiuterija, is the Lithuanian language edition.
- Thế Giới Vi Tính, is the Vietnamese language edition (also called PC World Vietnam).

== Controversy ==
In May 2007, McCracken resigned abruptly under controversial circumstances. According to sources quoted in Wired, McCracken quit abruptly because the new CEO of PC World, Colin Crawford, tried to kill an unfavorable story about Apple and Steve Jobs. Crawford responded, calling media reports of McCracken's resignation "inaccurate". CNET later reported that McCracken had told colleagues that IDG "was pressuring him to avoid stories that were critical of major advertisers."

On May 9, Crawford was transferred to another department, and McCracken returned to PC World until his departure in 2008.

== See also ==
- PC Magazine
- WorldBench
