= PADS =

PADS may refer to:

- PADS (CAD software), family of software tools, see Mentor Graphics
- Pads, sports protective equipment
- Post-Avatar depression syndrome

== See also ==
- PAD (disambiguation)
- Pad (disambiguation)
