= IBM WorkPad Z50 =

Handheld PC that was marketed by IBM in 1999

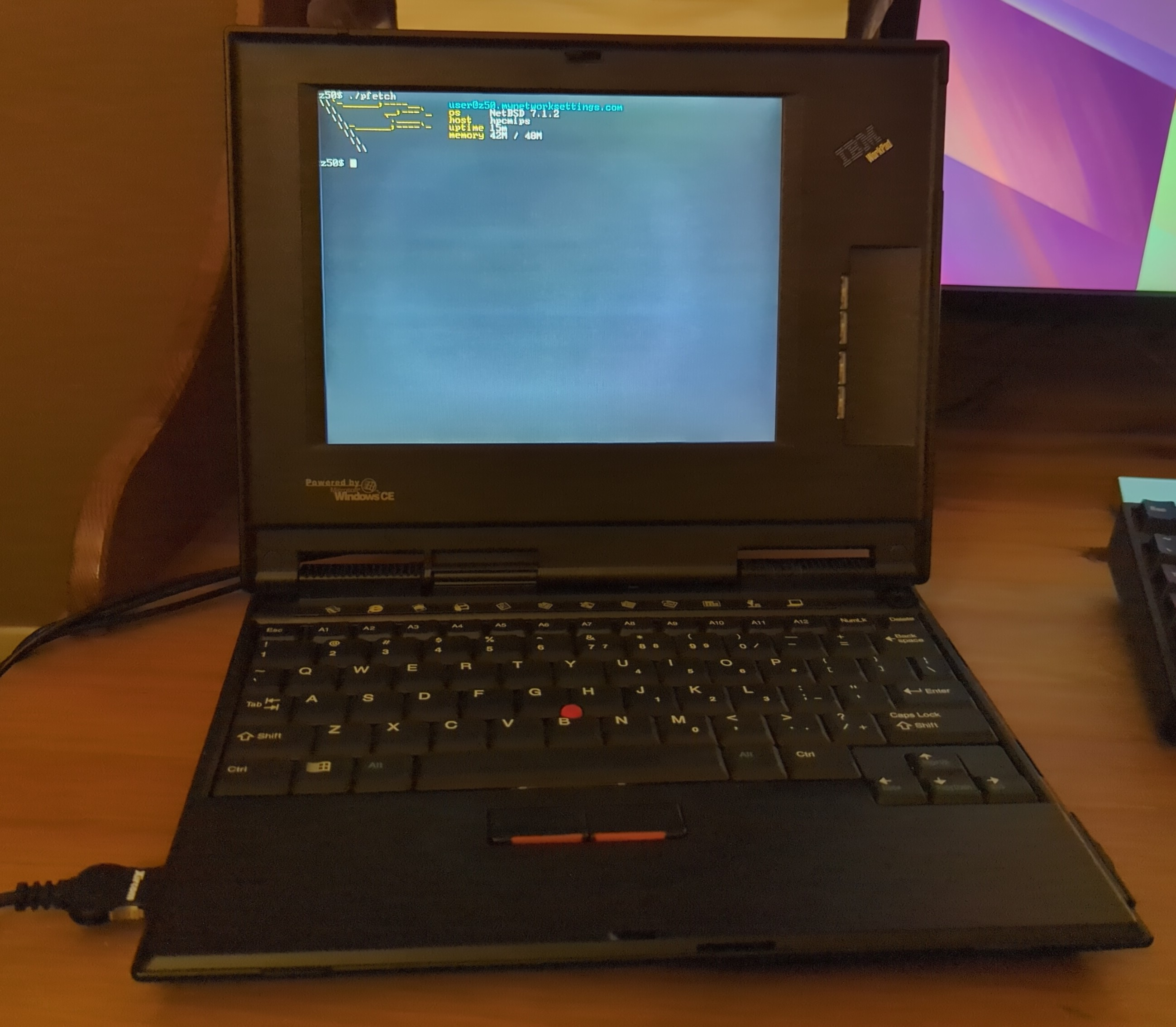
IBM WorkPad z50 running NetBSD

The IBM WorkPad z50 is a handheld PC that was marketed by IBM as part of the IBM WorkPad series. It runs on Windows CE. Unlike the rest of the devices in the IBM WorkPad series it is a subnotebook and not a PDA.

== History ==
It was released in 1999 for a price of $999.

== Specifications ==
z50 is a subnotebook, weighing 1206 g, with up-to 8 hours battery life from its Li-ion battery. It uses MIPS 4100 CPU (NEC VR4121) at 131 MHz, and features 16 MiB RAM (expandable up to 48 MiB with the official expansion pack) and ROM. It has a 640x480 display. WIRED noted that it bears similarity to the ThinkPad series.

It has been delivered with Windows CE. NetBSD is also compatible with the z50.

== Reception ==
Approving of WorkPad Z50's great keyboard and large amount of RAM, PC Magazine thought that it would prove the viability of Windows CE products.
