= PC World's Digital Duo =

US television program

PC World's Digital Duo was a computer themed US television series that aired on PBS stations in 1999 as Digital Duo for 26 episodes and returned to broadcast as PC World's Digital Duo with an additional 26 episodes in 2005. It ran for a half-hour per episode and was produced by Incandescent Entertainment. It featured co-hosts Stephen Manes of Forbes & PC World with Angela Gunn of USAToday.com in a "Siskel & Ebert" style format in which they would rate computer and on-line products and services. Each episode would also feature a commentary segment by Walt Mossberg.

== Episodes ==
Season	Episode number	Episode name	Release date	Duration
1	1	Ultralights	April 15, 2005	30 minutes
1	2	Instant Messaging	April 22, 2005	30 minutes
1	3	No Computer Required	April 29, 2005	30 minutes
1	4	Security Check	May 6, 2005	30 minutes
1	5	Music to Your Ears	May 13, 2005	30 minutes
1	6	HDTV and More	May 20, 2005	30 minutes
1	7	Health and Fitness	May 27, 2005	30 minutes
1	8	Get the Picture	June 3, 2005	30 minutes
1	9	Outdoor Tech	June 10, 2005	30 minutes
1	10	Travel Tech	June 17, 2005	30 minutes
1	11	Shooting Stars	June 24, 2005	30 minutes
1	12	Beauties and Beasts	July 1, 2005	30 minutes
1	13	Seek and Ye Shall Find	July 8, 2005	30 minutes
2	14	The PC Buying Guide Show	October 14, 2005	30 minutes
2	15	The Shopping Show	October 21, 2005	30 minutes
2	16	The Family Tech Show	October 28, 2005	30 minutes
2	17	The Car Show	November 4, 2005	30 minutes
2	18	The Cell Phone Show	Nov 11, 2005	30 minutes
2	19	The Social Show	November 18, 2005	30 minutes
2	20	The Output Show	November 25, 2005	30 minutes
2	21	The Audio Show	December 2, 2005	30 minutes
2	22	The Storage Show	December 9, 2005	30 minutes
2	23	The TV Show	December 16, 2005	30 minutes
2	24	The Mail Show	December 23, 2005	30 minutes
2	25	The Money Show	December 30, 2005	30 minutes
2	26	The Home Show	January 6, 2006	30 minutes
