= IBM WorkPad =

Line of Palm OS devices

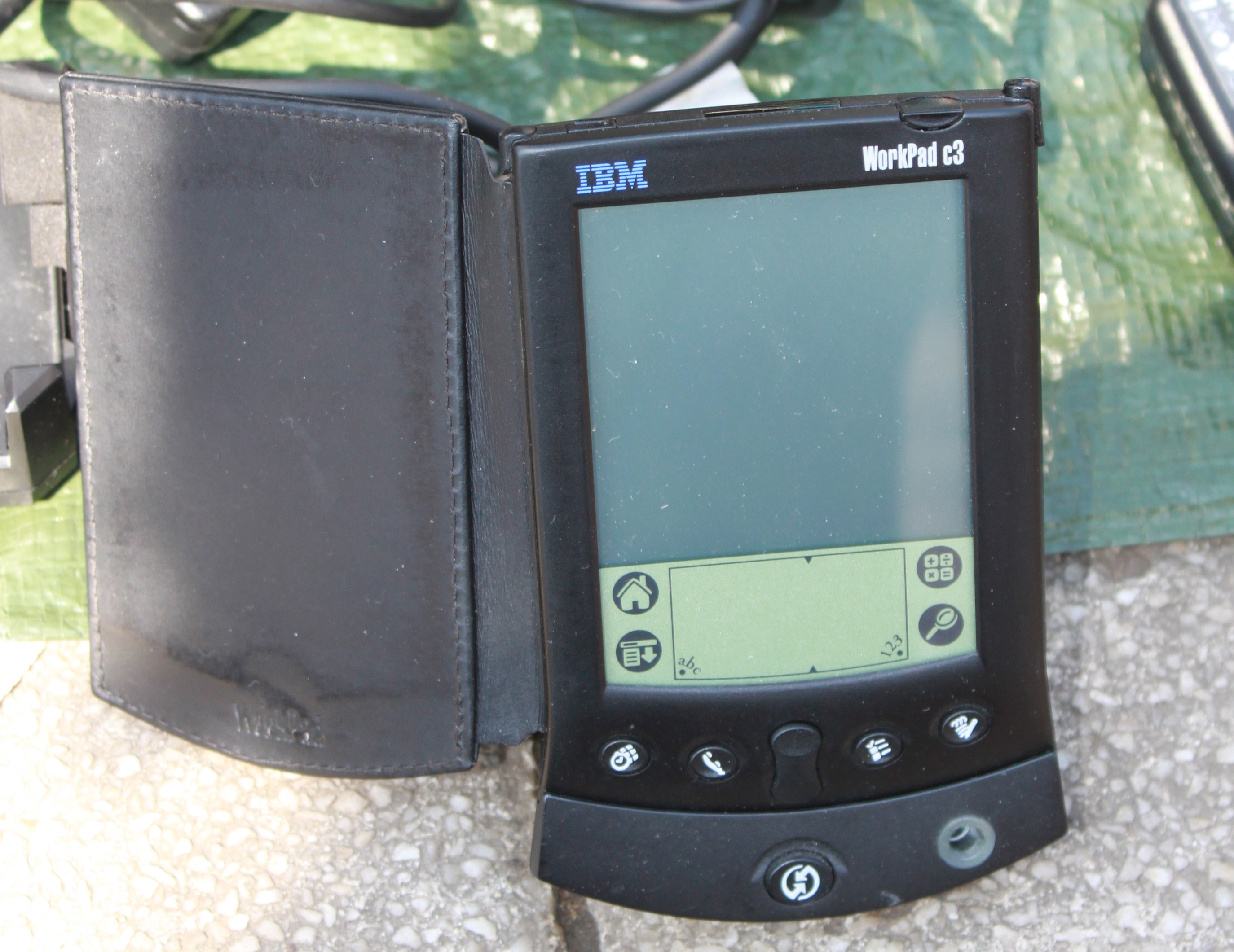
- WorkPad c3
- Type: PDA
- Released: June 1997; 29 years ago
- Discontinued: 2002; 24 years ago
- Operating system: Palm OS 2.0 - 4.1 (PDA); Windows CE (WorkPad Z50)
- CPU: Motorola 68328 (16-33 MHz)
- Memory: 2-8 MB

IBM WorkPad was a line of portable devices, produced by Palm Inc. and branded by IBM. This line contained personal digital assistants (PDAs) and one subnotebook model (WorkPad Z50).

== Overview ==
This line was released in 1997 and discontinued in 2002. After discontinuation of its self-branded line, IBM still offers the main Palm line on its site.

This IBM-branded line of PDAs were rebranded PalmPilots, with only a few software improvements (easy sync for Lotus Notes, DB2 EveryPlace, and IBM Mobile Connect).

=== Reception ===
Early WorkPad PDAs were received positively, similar to parallel Palm models; but later this conservative business-oriented line lacked notability, and multimedia options of latest models were described as relatively poor.

== Models ==
WorkPad Z50 - 1999, subnotebook/thin client, powered by Windows CE, equipped with an NEC MIPS processor and with an 8.2" screen.

=== PDAs ===
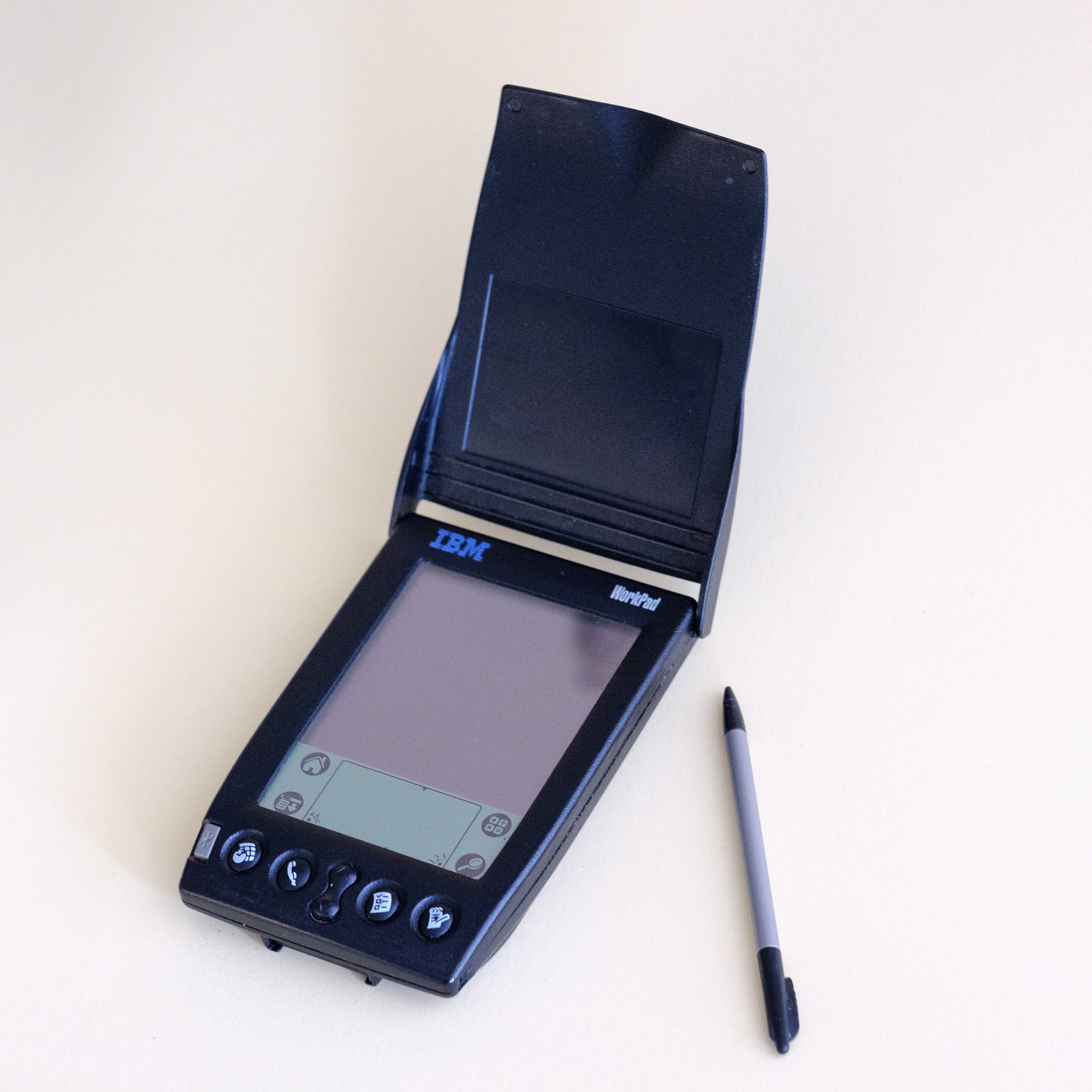
WorkPad 30X

All WorkPad PDAs have a similar gray-scale screen (with better resolution and contrast for C series, but with same physical size and similar layout); only the c505 model has a color screen. The WorkPad 30X can be upgraded to a Japanese version, using the Open Extension slot.

WorkPad - 1997, rebadged PalmPilot

WorkPad 20X - 1998, rebadged Palm III

WorkPad 30X - 1999, rebadged Palm IIIx

WorkPad 30J - 1999, Japanese version of 30X

WorkPad 31J - 2000, same as 30J, but with PHS broadband module.

WorkPad 31A - 2000, version of 31J with locked phone operator.

C series with new thin, sleek metal case:

WorkPad c3 -1999/2000, rebadged Palm V/Vx; also known as WorkPad 40J and WorkPad 50J.

WorkPad c500 -2001, rebadged Palm m500; also known as WorkPad 60U.

WorkPad c505 -2001, rebadged Palm m505; also known as WorkPad 70J.

== Accessories ==
Most WorkPad PDAs can use the same peripherals as the PalmPilot; for example, the external keyboard available for some models, and most WorkPads can be attached to a cradle for charging or connection to a PC; the WorkPad can be attached to a Palm cradle, and vice versa.

Some WorkPads (and sibling Palm models) can be attached to some ThinkPad laptops, using an Ultrabay cradle; This would be the Palm V, m500, m505, and the WorkPad c500 and c505 models.

== See also ==
- PDA
- ThinkPad laptops
- WatchPad smartwatches
- ChipCard phone
- List of Palm OS devices
