= Chicken Trek =

1987 novel by Stephen Manes

Chicken Trek: The Third Strange Thing That Happened to Oscar Noodleman
- First edition cover (publ. Dutton)
- Author: Stephen Manes
- Illustrator: Ron Barrett
- Publisher: Dutton
- Publication date: June 1, 1987

Chicken Trek: The Third Strange Thing That Happened to Oscar Noodleman is a 1987 children's comedy novel by Stephen Manes with drawings by Ron Barrett.

As the title implies, it is the third of a series told from the viewpoint of the protagonist Oscar Noodleman. It follows That Game from Outer Space and The Oscar J. Noodleman Television Network.

== Plot summary ==
In Chicken Trek, Oscar Noodleman goes to Secaucus, New Jersey to visit his cousin Dr. Prechtwinkle, an inventor. Before this, however, he had dropped Dr. Prechtwinkle's valuable camera, and now has to work for him to repay the debt. Dr. Prechtwinkle tells Oscar about a contest where the goal is to eat a "Bagful o' Chicken" at all 211 Chicken in a Bag restaurants nationwide. The prize from this contest would pay Oscar's debt, so they attempt to win it.

== Publication history ==
- 1st edition: New York, Dutton, c1987, ISBN 0-525-44312-6
