= IBM WatchPad =

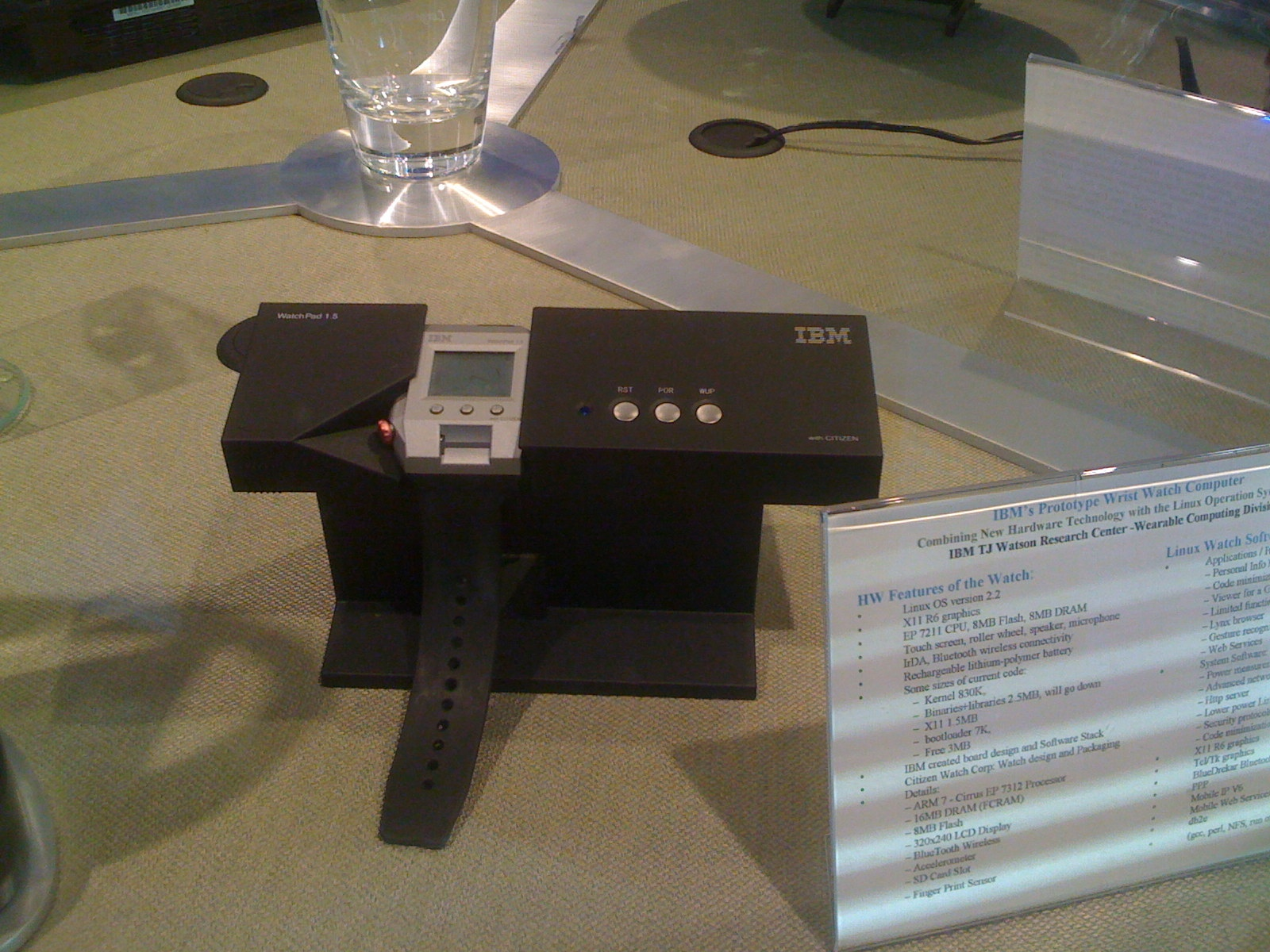
- WatchPad 1.5
- Type: Smartwatch
- Released: June 2000; 26 years ago
- Discontinued: 2002; 24 years ago
- CPU: ARM V7
- Memory: 8 MB
- Display: 320×240 STN Monochrome
- Website: trl.ibm.com/projects/ngm at the Wayback Machine (archived 2002-06-09)

The IBM WatchPad was a line of earlier smartwatch prototypes, produced in 2000-2002.

== Overview ==
In June 2000, IBM displayed a prototype for a wristwatch that ran Linux. The original version had only 6 hours of battery life, which was later extended to 12. It featured 8 MB of RAM and ran Linux 2.2. The device was later upgraded with an accelerometer, vibrating mechanism, and fingerprint sensor. IBM began to collaborate with Citizen Watch Co. to create the "WatchPad". The WatchPad 1.5 features a 320 × 240 QVGA monochrome touch sensitive display and runs Linux 2.4. It also features calendar software, Bluetooth, 8 MB of RAM and 16 MB of flash memory. Citizen was hoping to market the watch to students and businessmen, with a retail price of around $399.

== Models ==
- IBM WatchPad (2000)
- IBM WatchPad 1.5 (2001)

== See also ==
- ThinkPad laptops
- WorkPad handhelds
