= Stephen Manes =

American writer

- Born: January 8, 1949 (age 77); Pittsburgh, Pennsylvania, U.S.
- Education: University of Southern California (BA)
- Occupation: Author · magazine columnist · screenwriter
- Spouse: Susan Kocik

Stephen Manes (born January 8, 1949) is an American author, magazine columnist, and screenwriter known for the 2011 nonfiction book Where Snowflakes Dance and Swear: Inside the Land of Ballet. Its subject, the workings of a ballet company, marked a significant departure for an author best known for his journalism on technology and his books for children.

== Early life and education ==
Born and raised in Pittsburgh. He attended the University of Chicago and earned a Bachelor of Arts degree in cinema from the School of Cinematic Arts at the University of Southern California.

== Career ==
Manes wrote the "Digital Tools" column that appeared in every issue of Forbes from August 1998 until February 2007, when he announced a six-month "break" after his review of Windows Vista. From April 1995 to December 2008, he also wrote the "Full Disclosure" column anchoring the back page of PC World. Manes was also co-host and co-executive editor of the public television series PC World's Digital Duo, a program he helped create.

Manes was previously the Personal Computers columnist for the Science Times section of The New York Times and a regular columnist for InformationWeek. He wrote about technology since 1982 as a columnist and contributing editor for PCMag, PC/Computing, PC Sources, PCjr, and NetGuide. The now defunct Marketing Computers named him one of the four most influential writers about the computer industry and called him "a strong critical voice."

Manes co-authored the best-selling biography Gates: How Microsoft's Mogul Reinvented an Industry—and Made Himself the Richest Man in America. He also wrote The Complete MCI Mail Handbook and programmed much of the Starfixer and UnderGround WordStar software packages.

Manes is also the author of more than 30 books for children and young adults, including the Publishers Weekly bestseller Make Four Million Dollars by Next Thursday! and the award-winning Be a Perfect Person in Just Three Days!, which was adapted for the public television series WonderWorks. His books include Chicken Trek and The Obnoxious Jerks and have won a commendation from the National Science Foundation and International Reading Association Children's Choice awards. His writing credits also include television series and the 1976 film Mother, Jugs & Speed.

Manes has served as an elected member of the National Council of the Authors Guild, the country's oldest organization of book authors.

== Personal life ==
Manes lives in Seattle with his wife, Susan Kocik.
