= Pad Fork =

Stream in West Virginia, U.S.

Coordinates: 38°38′12″N 81°20′17″W

Pad Fork is a stream in the U.S. state of West Virginia.

Pad Fork most likely derives its name from the lily pads along its course.

== See also ==
- List of rivers of West Virginia
