= ThinkPad 240 =

Computer model by IBM

IBM ThinkPad 240-series

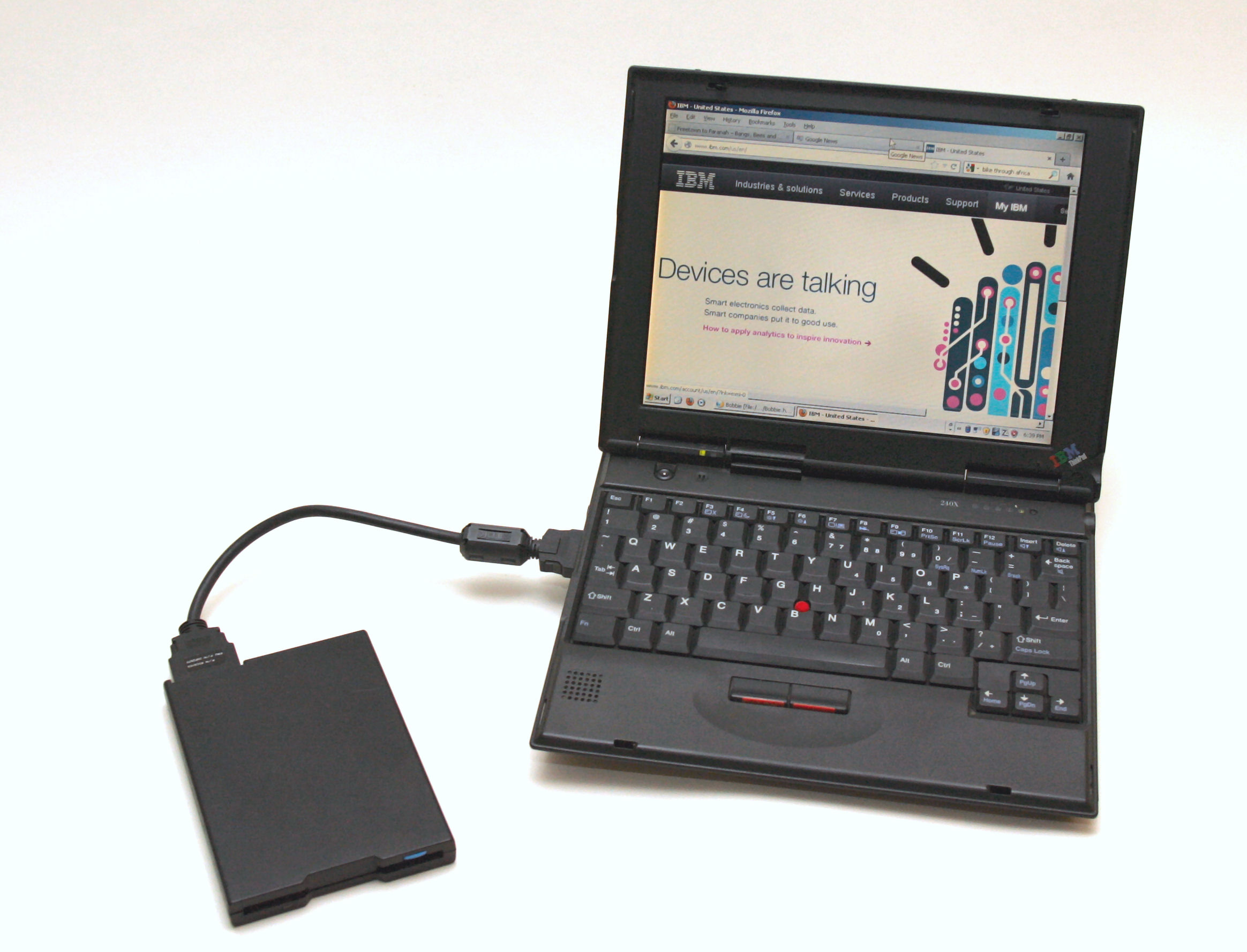
- IBM Thinkpad 240X
- Manufacturer: IBM
- Released: June 1999; 27 years ago
- Introductory price: US$1999.00 (Thinkpad 240, 16 June 1999)
- Discontinued: 2001
- CPU: Intel Mobile Celeron 300, Pentium III
- Memory: 64 MB RAM (maximum 320 MB)
- Connectivity: VGA out, serial port, parallel port, IBM external drive port, CardBus, Mini PCI, USB 1.0
- Dimensions: 10.2 x 8.0 x 1.05" (260.0 x 202.0 x 26.6 mm)
- Weight: 2.9 lb (1.3 kg)
- Made in: Taiwan
- Website: pc.ibm.com/us/thinkpad/240series at the Wayback Machine (archived 2000-05-11)

IBM ThinkPad 240 is an ultra-portable laptop computer designed and produced by IBM from June 1999 to 2001. It is one of the few ThinkPad 200 series models made available in America and was the smallest and lightest ThinkPad model produced to date. The 240 series was discontinued, and it (as well as the 570 series) was replaced with the ThinkPad X series in 2000.

== Features ==
The first 240 series models included the 300 MHz Mobile Celeron processor, 64 MB built-in RAM and one slot for memory expansion (maximum 320 MB). The laptop also was one of the first to feature the Mini PCI card slot. No built-in optical drive or diskette drive was included due to size limitations. External drive access was via a USB 1.0 port and/or the IBM external floppy drive connector. The unit shipped either with a standard 6 GB hard disk drive or with the 12 GB upgrade option.

All 240 series models feature a 10.4 TFT display, and the first models featured NeoMagic MagicGraph128XD graphics chips with 2 MB of video memory. The 240 is capable of displaying up to SVGA (800x600) on the TFT display, with XGA output available to an external monitor. All 240s also have audio controllers and VGA ports to connect to external display devices.

The 240Z had a redesigned case with thicker palmrest.

== Models ==
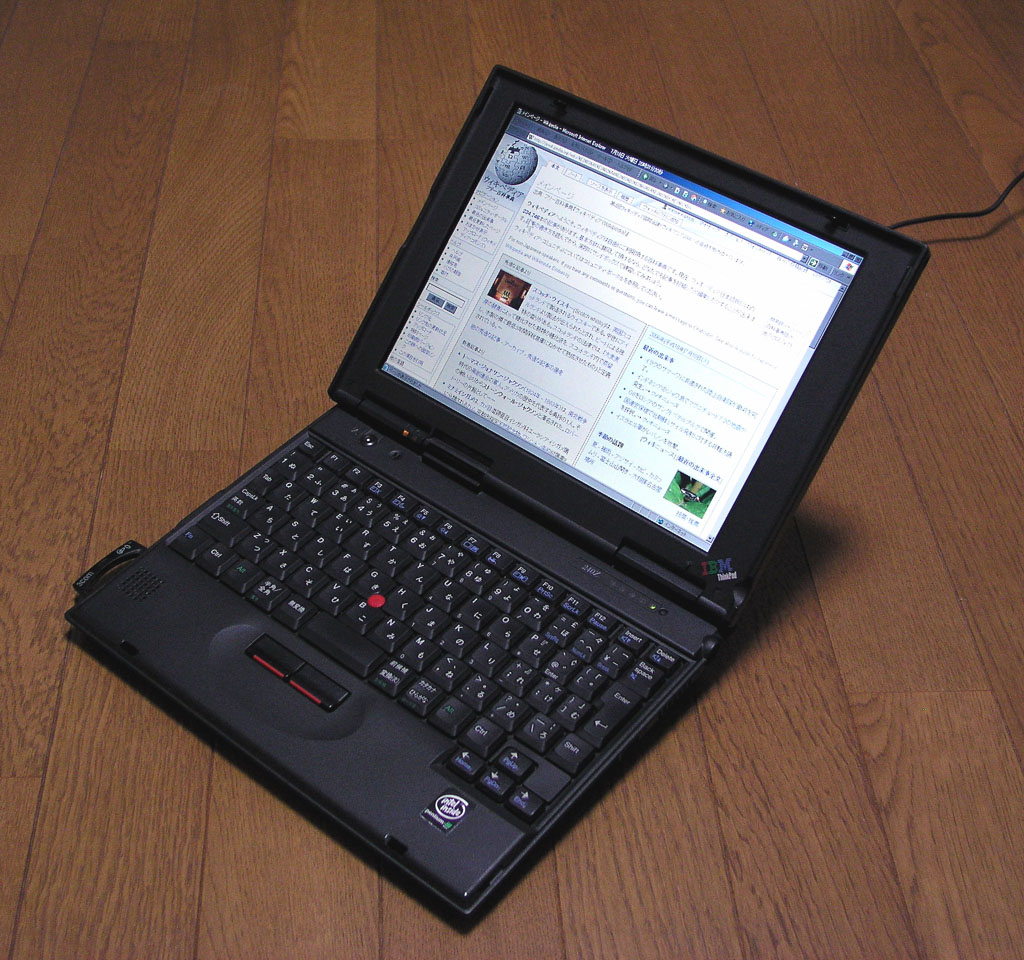
ThinkPad 240Z

	240	240X	240Z	i-Series 1124
CPU	Celeron 300, 366 or 400 MHz	Celeron 450 MHz or Pentium III 500 MHz	Celeron 500 MHz or Pentium III 600 MHz	Celeron 450 or 500 MHz, or Pentium III 500 MHz
RAM	96MB, max. 320MB SDRAM SODIMM (PC-66)	64 MB or 128 MB (soldered), + 32MB, 64MB or 128MB SDRAM SODIMM (PC-100)		
Graphics chip	Neomagic MagicGraph128XD with 2MB	SMI LynxEM+ with 2MB	SMI LynxEM+ with 2MB (SVGA-model) or SMI LynxEM4+ SM712 with 4MB (XGA-model)	
Display	Hitachi TX26D31VC1CAA 10.4" TFT Display with 800x600, max. 24-bit colordepth (SVGA)	Hitachi TX26D32VC1CAA 10.4" TFT Display with 800x600, max. 24-bit colordepth (SVGA)	Hitachi TX26D32VC1CAA 10.4" TFT Display with 800x600 (SVGA) or Hitachi TX26D20VC1CAA 1024x768 (XGA), max. 24-bit color depth (depending on VRAM)	
Disksize	6GB or 12GB	12GB	10GB or 20GB	
Operating system	Microsoft Windows 98 or NT 4.0	Windows 98 SE or Windows 2000		

== Reception ==
Joseph Leung from the South China Morning Post in December 1999 appreciated the compactness and portability of the ThinkPad 240. It also noted the short battery life and that it only has a single Type II PC Card slot. Peter H. Lewis from The New York Times noted that it is a niche product for people who travel a lot.

== Transmeta Crusoe ==
At the June 2000 PC Expo in New York, IBM demonstrated a ThinkPad 240 with a Transmeta Crusoe. In November, it was announced that IBM would not be using the Transmeta CPU in a 240. According to a source close to Transmeta, this was due to pressure from Intel.
