= People's Action for Development =

- Founded: registered in 1985 became active in 2002
- Type: Non-governmental organization
- Purpose: Community development
- Location: Madurai, India
- Region served: Gulf of Mannar
- Method: Microcredits, Resource management, Community Organization
- Website: www.padgom.org

People's Action for Development (PAD) has been working with more than 14,000 families of fishers, palmyrah tappers, dalits, children and women in Thoothukudi and Ramanathapuram districts of Gulf of Mannar region. Amongst the various activities of PAD, community organisation and development, natural resources management, gender and development, animal husbandry, savings and credit, Information generation and dissemination to needy people and community-based disaster risk management (CBDRM) through Information and communication technology (ICT) tools, etc., are important and supported by outside donor organizations. Moreover, PAD serves as a resource organization in imparting participatory methods; livelihoods research methodology, logical framework analysis.
