= Samsung SPH-i500 =

Mobile phone model

- Manufacturer: Samsung Electronics
- Availability by region: Summer of 2003 - August 2005
- Predecessor: Samsung SPH-i330
- Successor: Samsung SPH-i550 (cancelled)
- Compatible networks: CDMA
- Form factor: Clamshell
- Dimensions: 3.4×2.1×1 in (86×53×25 mm)
- Weight: 130 g (4.6 oz)
- Operating system: Palm OS 4.1
- CPU: Dragonball 66 MHz
- Memory: 16 MB
- Battery: Li-ion
- Display: 160 X 240 px
- Connectivity: USB, Infrared (IrDA)
- Data inputs: Graffiti, telephone keypad

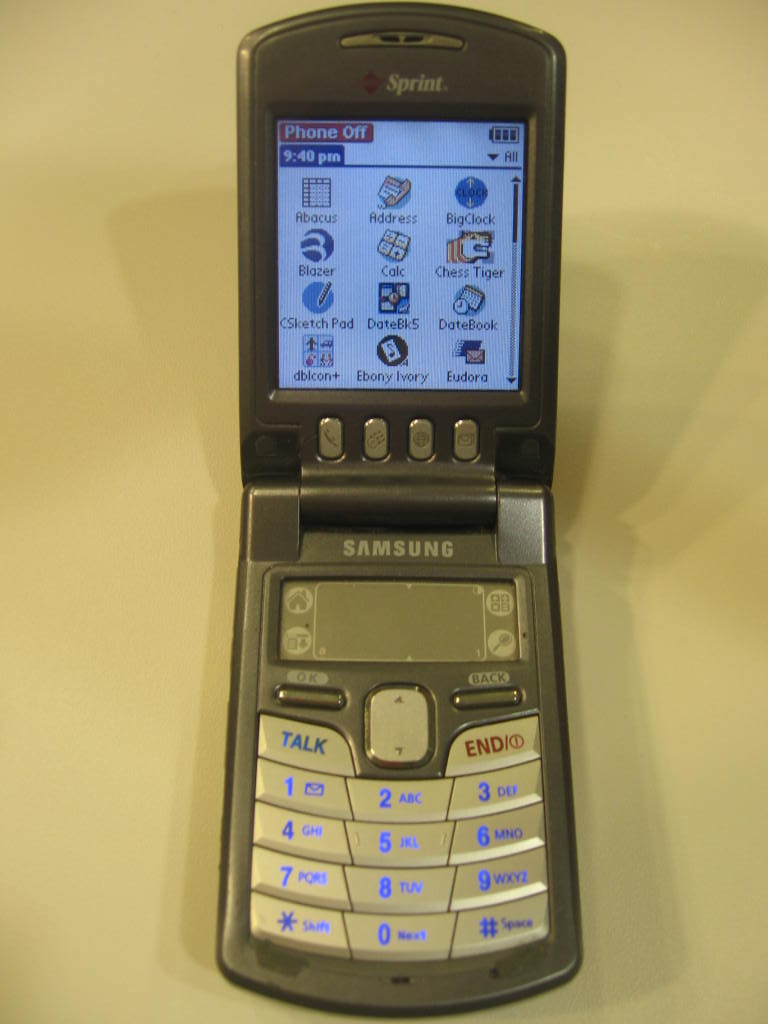
An open Samsung SPH-i500

The Samsung SPH-i500 is a Palm OS-based smartphone manufactured by Samsung Electronics. It was previewed at CommunicAsia 2002 in June and launched later that year. It was later discontinued in August 2005. It was marketed in the United States for use on Sprint's mobile phone network.

The CDMA phone has a clamshell-style design, with the 160×240 pixel color display on the top half, and the Graffiti area and telephone keypad on the bottom half. It operates like a standard color Palm OS device, but several hard (external) and software-imbedded buttons launch the 'phone' application, which manages calls. Once a call is connected, it is possible to switch back to another application. Despite the Graffiti interface, the device could not send text messages, though it could receive them.

The phone shipped with an extra battery and extra stylus. The supplied power cable could be used as a travel charger or to plug into the included cradle, which could charge the phone and an extra battery simultaneously. Despite two batteries, the phone needed to be plugged in regularly. Swapping charged batteries would eventually result in a phone reset---a complete loss of user data.

== Specifications ==
- Processor: Dragonball 66 MHz
- Weight: 130 g
- Operating System: Palm OS 4.1
- RAM: 16 MB

== Applications ==
Applications include the Handspring Blazer microbrowser and Voice Memo, but exclude Palm OS Note Pad. Shortly after the i500 was discontinued, Handspring discontinued proxy service for the Blazer browser. Sprint provided a free install of Novarra's nweb browser as a replacement. This browser was functional on the i500 until its proxy was taken down in 2008.

Installed applications included ones carried over from existing Palm handheld non-phone devices:

Address
Calc
DateBook
Graffiti
Expense
Memo Pad
Preferences
Security
To Do
Welcome

In addition, applications to support voice and data communications were included:

Blazer (web browser)
Mail
Messages
Phone
Speed Dial
Voice Dial
Voice Memo
Voicemail

Note that the Voicemail application was not a distinct executable, but rather aliased directly to the Voicemail category in the Messages application.

== History ==
The SPH-i500 is the last Palm-OS-based smartphone to use a clamshell design and employ Graffiti input. It is the only clamshell to use the upper block for the display, and the lower for input. Its successors use a brick form phone and a keypad for input.

Samsung developed a follow-on Palm OS smartphone with multimedia features, the SPH-i550, but Sprint canceled it.

== Reviews ==
CNET gave it 4/5, praising it as a good integration of Palm PDA and phone, but criticised its price and lack of expansion slot. PCMag gave it 4/5, a rating of "excellent", also praising it as a phone that unites PDA and phone with few compromises. It was also well-reviewed by Mobile Tech Review.
