= Kyocera 6035 =

Mobile phone model

Kyocera QCP 6035
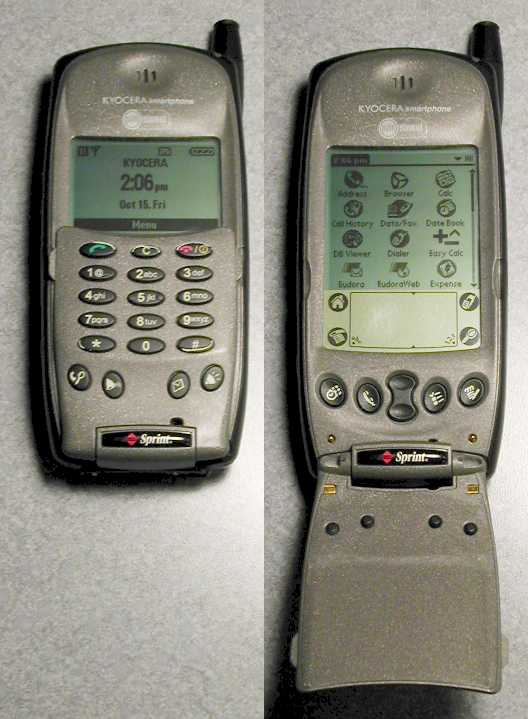
- Kyocera QCP 6035 (United States - Sprint), with flip closed and open
- Manufacturer: Kyocera
- Type: Smartphone
- Predecessor: Qualcomm pdQ
- Successor: Kyocera 7135
- Related: Handspring Treo 180; Samsung SPH-i300
- Form factor: Flip
- Dimensions: 142 mm (5.6 in) H 64 mm (2.5 in) W 22 mm (0.87 in) D
- Weight: 208 g (7.3 oz)
- Operating system: Palm OS 3.5.2
- CPU: 20 MHz DragonBall EZ
- Memory: 8 MB
- Battery: Lithium-ion
- Display: 160 x 160 px, reverse backlight
- Data inputs: keypad, touch (resistive screen)
- SAR: 1.23 W/kg at the ear 0.395 W/kg when worn on body

The Kyocera QCP-6035 was one of the first smartphones to appear in the American market, released in January 2001, one of the first devices to combine a PDA with a mobile phone. Its predecessor was the Qualcomm pdQ (800 and 1900) released in 1999, built by Qualcomm's handset division (Qualcomm Personal Electronics), which Kyocera acquired in 2000.

== Software and integration ==
The phone appears to have a dual-software nature, with the cellphone firmware operating independently (though available through an interface) from the Palm OS system. Like most modern smartphones, the phone operations can be off while the Palm operates, and vice versa. The systems are sufficiently integrated to pass important messages and commands to each other, though the phone's operating parameters (settings, phone book, speed and voice dial, call history etc.) are configured via the Palm OS system.

== Physical systems ==
The phone has physical buttons for cellphone use, arranged on a flip which covers the Palm buttons, Graffiti area, and part of the screen. The upper part of the screen shows the phone system display when the flip is closed; when the flip is open the screen switches to Palm operation. With the flip closed, phone operations are performed via the flip buttons and a side thumb wheel.

== Technical specifications ==
The Palm OS system benefits from the integrated cell phone by utilizing it as an attached modem. This allows the Palm to take advantage of any IP-based Palm applications, such as email clients and web browsers. The phone can also be used as an external modem for a computer via the HotSync cradle.

The phone can receive SMS messages, but earlier firmware revisions did not come with a mechanism to send them. It is WAP capable, but not MMS capable.

The 6035 comes with 8 MB of Palm memory and is not expandable. The display resolution of the 6035 is 160x160 pixels. It can perform HotSync and IR communication just as a normal Palm.

== Awards ==
The QCP6035 won several awards at the time, including:

- CDMA Development Group's 3G Industry Achievement Award for Subscriber Technology, 2001
- MobileFocus Award in the mobile phone category at the PC Expo show, 2001

== Versions and successor ==
Different versions of the phone were made available for different CDMA wireless networks, eventually being released in Canada on Bell Mobility in late 2001. (It was never made for GSM).

The successor to the 6035 was the Kyocera 7135, released in 2003.
