= Palm OS Simulator =

Palm OS Simulator (also known as PalmOS Simulator) is a version of the Palm OS compiled for x86-based computers. No emulation is used, as it runs natively on top of Microsoft Windows.

There are only Palm OS simulators for Palm OS 5 and newer. The Palm OS Emulator requires a ROM file of a real Palm, however the Simulator uses specific builds for different devices.

There are simulators for reference releases of Palm OS 5.0, 5.1, 5.2, 5.3, 5.4, 6.0 and 6.1, and also device-specific simulators (Tungsten C, Treo 650, LifeDrive, etc.).

== See also ==
- POSE (Palm OS Emulator)
- StyleTap
- Garnet VM
