= Palm OS Emulator =

Palm OS Emulator is an emulator developed by Palm, Inc., used for writing, testing, and debugging Palm OS applications. Palm OS Emulator emulates Motorola 68000-class devices and has intimate knowledge of Palm OS's inner working, allowing for the close monitoring of correct application operation. It was a descendant of Copilot, an earlier utility developed by Palm. Unlike Copilot and Xcopilot (another descendant), Palm OS Emulator will not boot uClinux. By using "skin" files, Palm OS Emulator could very closely mimic the appearance of many models of Palm handheld.

All versions of Palm OS Emulator require a file containing the ROM image to boot. ROM image files can be obtained from PalmSource (now part of Access Co., Ltd), or downloaded from a real Palm device. Palm OS Emulator supported Palm models produced by Palm, Handera, Handspring, and Symbol. Palm OS handhelds produced by Sony (the Clie line) were supported by a separate, Sony-specific fork of Palm OS Emulator.

Both Copilot and Palm OS Emulator are released under the GPL v2. Versions were developed by Palm, Inc. for Windows, Macintosh, and Unix platforms. The Sony fork was only released for Windows.

Palm OS Emulator supports Palm OS 4.x and earlier. It cannot support Palm OS 5.x and later, as those versions are based on the ARM processor. PalmSource provides simulators for Palm OS 5.x and up, where the Palm OS has been recompiled to run natively under Windows.

Linux, Mac, and Windows versions of the emulator were included on the CD-ROM included with Palm Programming: The Developer's Guide, published by O'Reilly in 1999.

== See also ==
- Palm OS Simulator
- Palm OS
- StyleTap
- Xcopilot
