= J-Pilot =

- Developer: Judd Montgomery
- Initial release: 0.90a / June 23, 1999
- Stable release: 2.0.1 / April 2, 2021
- Written in: GTK+
- Operating system: Unix-like, Linux
- Platform: Palm OS
- License: GPL-2.0 license
- Website: http://www.jpilot.org/
- Repository: github.com/juddmon/jpilot

J-Pilot is an open-source GTK+-based desktop organizer for Unix-like systems written by Judd Montgomery, designed to work with Palm OS-based handheld PDAs. It uses the pilot-link libraries to communicate with Palm devices. It is released under the GNU GPL, version 2.

== Linux support ==
Palm does not provide a version of the software for Linux operating system, nor do they officially support the ones developed by third parties such as J-Pilot or Gnome-Pilot.

== Features ==
- Third-party Application Support
- Plugin Support
- Import and Export Features
- Supports Palm Application Features
- Supports Datebook, Address, To Do List, and Memo Pad
- Supports the newer Contacts and Memos (Calendar and Tasks not yet)

== Installation instructions ==
Installation instructions are available in the README.md file, in the J-Pilot source code repository.

== See also ==
- Palm Desktop
- Gnome-Pilot
- ColdSync
- PilotManager
