= Samsung SPH-i300 =

Mobile phone model

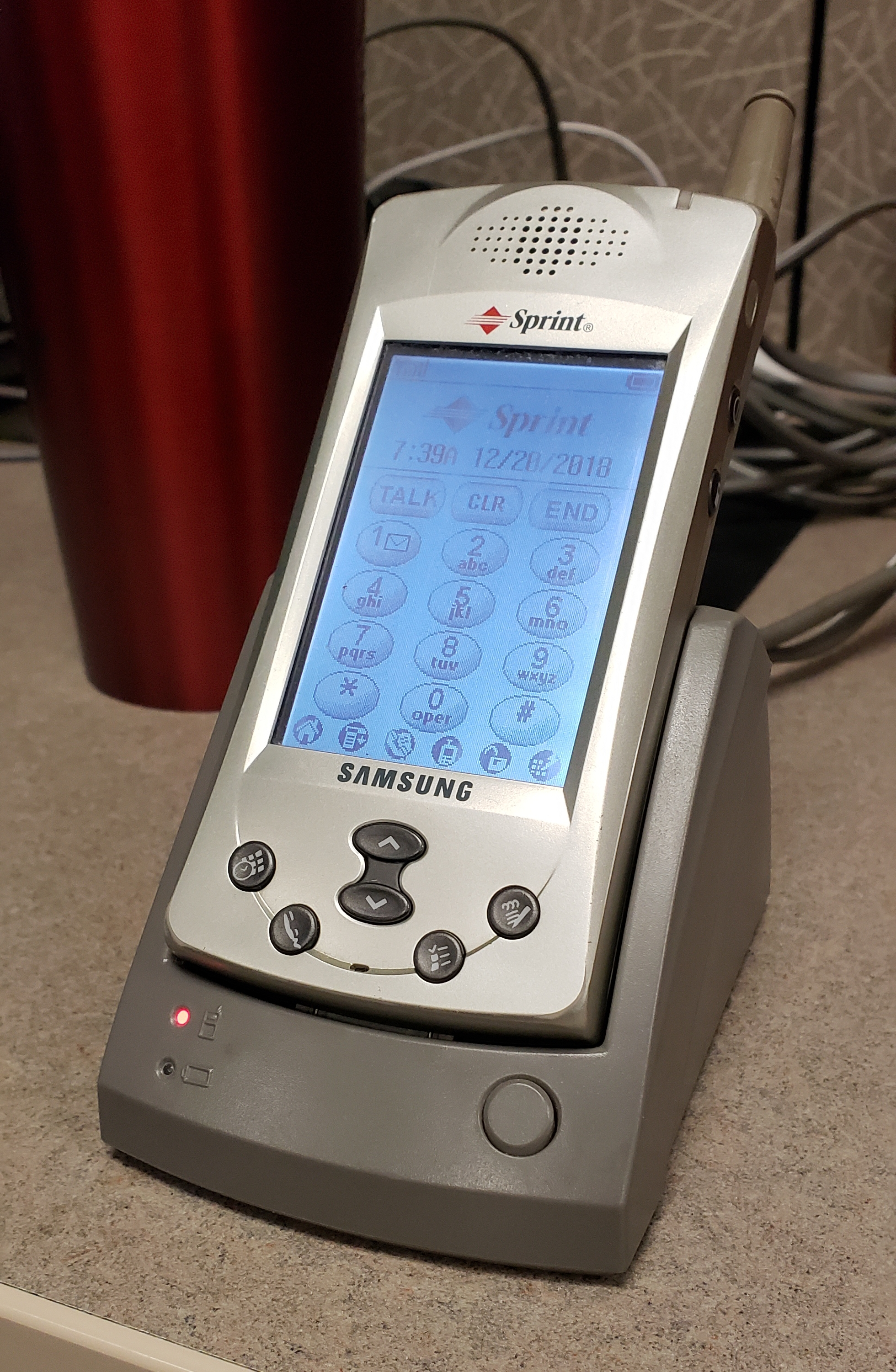
- The i300 sitting on its charging cradle
- Manufacturer: Samsung Electronics
- First released: Q4 2001
- Successor: Samsung SPH-i330
- Related: Handspring Treo 180; Kyocera 6035
- Compatible networks: Sprint CDMA 800/1900 / AMPS 800
- Form factor: candybar
- Dimensions: 4.9 by 2.28 by 0.82 inches
- Weight: 6 oz (170 g)
- Operating system: Palm OS 3.5
- Memory: 8 MB
- Battery: Li-ion
- Display: 160 × 240 px, 256 color
- Connectivity: DE-9 Serial port via cradle, infrared (IrDA)
- Data inputs: Graffiti, touchscreen

The Samsung SPH-i300 is a mobile phone running on Palm OS, manufactured by Samsung. The device was released in October 2001 and marketed in the United States for use on Sprint's CDMA based cellular network. It was the first "PDA phone" (as devices that combined phone and PDA functions were then called) in the US with a color screen.

The phone has a candybar-style design. It operates like a standard color Palm OS device, but several hard (external) and software buttons launch the 'phone' application, which manages calls. The phone shipped with a charging cradle with a DE-9 serial port, extra battery, and a case.

== Applications ==
Installed applications included ones carried over from existing Palm handheld non-phone devices: Graffiti, Memo Pad, Date Book, Scheduler, Calculator, To Do List, Alarm/Clock, Address Book, Expense Manager, and Palm Desktop Software. ZIO PalmGolf was another application.

In addition, applications to support voice and data communications were included: Blazer, Mail, Messages, Phone, Speed Dial, Voice Dial, and Voice Memo.

== History and reception ==
The SPH-i300 was the first Palm-OS-based smartphone from Samsung, and cost $499. The phone was not compatible with Sprint's CDMA 1x network (which is actually 2.5G but was wrongly labeled by Sprint as 3G) and its maximum connection speed of 14.4 kbit/s made browsing slow, but browsing "the real web" in 2001 was an advance on the WAP browsers on other mobile phones. It competed with another Palm OS phone, the Kyocera 6035, which was the first Palm OS based cellular phone.

=== Follow-up SPH-i330 model ===
Samsung followed up the SPH-i300 with the SPH-i330 in 2003, also on Sprint. The SPH-i330 has a more rounded body and PC connectivity over USB rather than a serial port, but has the same screen, Palm OS version, and general feature set as the SPH-i300.

== Footnotes ==
- All details and specifications are from the CNET review and specification page unless otherwise indicated.
