= G18 =

G18 may refer to:

== Roads ==
- G-18 (Michigan county highway)
- County Route G18 (California)
- G18 Rongcheng–Wuhai Expressway, in China

== Vehicles ==
- ARM Juan Aldama (G18), an Auk-class minesweeper of the Mexican Navy
- Chase G-18, an American combat glider
- EMD G18, an American diesel locomotive
- Fiat G.18, an Italian airliner
- HMS Battleaxe (G18), a Weapon-class destroyer of the Royal Navy

== Other uses ==
- Glock 18, an automatic handgun
- Prince G-18, a car engine
- Xplore G18, a cellular phone
