= PDB (Palm OS) =

Container format

PDB is a container format for record databases in Palm OS, Garnet OS and Access Linux Platform. Its structure is similar to PRC resource databases. The PalmDOC eBook format is a special version of the PDB format.

== Structure of PDB file ==
A PDB file contains a PDB header, PDB record headers and records.

PDB Header
PDB Record Header
PDB Records

=== PDB Header ===
The PDB header is located at the beginning of the file and contains meta-information on the file:

Offset	Name	Type	Size
0x00	name	char (Modified ISO-8859-1)	32 Bytes
0x20	file attributes	integer	2 Bytes
0x22	version	integer	2 Bytes
0x24	creation time	32bit integer - PDB Datetime	4 Bytes
0x28	modification time	32bit integer - PDB Datetime	4 Bytes
0x2c	backup time	32bit integer - PDB Datetime	4 Bytes
0x30	modification number	integer	4 Bytes
0x34	app_info	integer	4 Bytes
0x38	sort_info	integer	4 Bytes
0x3c	type	integer	4 Bytes
0x40	creator	integer	4 Bytes
0x44	unique_id_seed	integer	4 Bytes
0x48	next_record_list	integer	4 Bytes
0x4c	num_records	integer	2 Bytes

=== PDB Record Header ===
For every record, there is an eight byte record header, containing:

name	type	size	notes
offset	integer	4 bytes	Byte number in the PDB file (counting from zero), where the record is located
attributes	byte	1 byte	Attributes of the record (delete/dirty/busy/secret/category)
UniqueID	integer	3 bytes	Always 0

=== PDB Records ===
Now the records themselves follow. The usual order is AppInfoArea, SortInfoArea and records, sequentially.

=== PDB Datetimes ===
Many PDB format files used times counting in seconds from 1904-01-01T00:00:00. This is the base time used by the original Macintosh (up to Mac OS 9). It may be noted that there were close links between Palm OS and Mac OS during early development. Using an unsigned 32-bit integer and the 1904 epoch, integer overflow will overflow will occur sometime in 2040.

Others may be observed to be counting from 1970-01-01T00:00:00 (the Unix epoch base time), and uses a signed 32-bit integer which will overflow sometime in 2038.

Palm OS Protein C/C++ Compiler Language & Library Reference, Copyright 2004 Palm Source calls the dates calculated from 1904 "old Palm epoch", and the dates calculated from 1970 "UNIX epoch". Protein C also provides functions (palm_seconds_to_time_t(), and time_t_to_palm_seconds() ) for converting between the two.

Some sources even suggest some very old files may use times counting from 1900 (which would be consistent with the Excel epoch).

This conflict between old Palm (Mac OS 9) epoch and UNIX epoch is unfortunate, the following heuristic may be useful when examining a file copied from a Palm OS device:

- If the time has the top bit set, it's an unsigned 32-bit number counting from 1st Jan 1904
- If the time has the top bit clear, it's a signed 32-bit number counting from 1st Jan 1970.

This is based on the idea that, otherwise the time would be before 1972 or before 1970 (depending on the interpretation) and the PDB format wasn't around then.

The palmdump utility and other software uses this rule-of-thumb when reading files.

== See also ==
- PRC format
