= NetFront =

Mobile browser

NetFront Browser
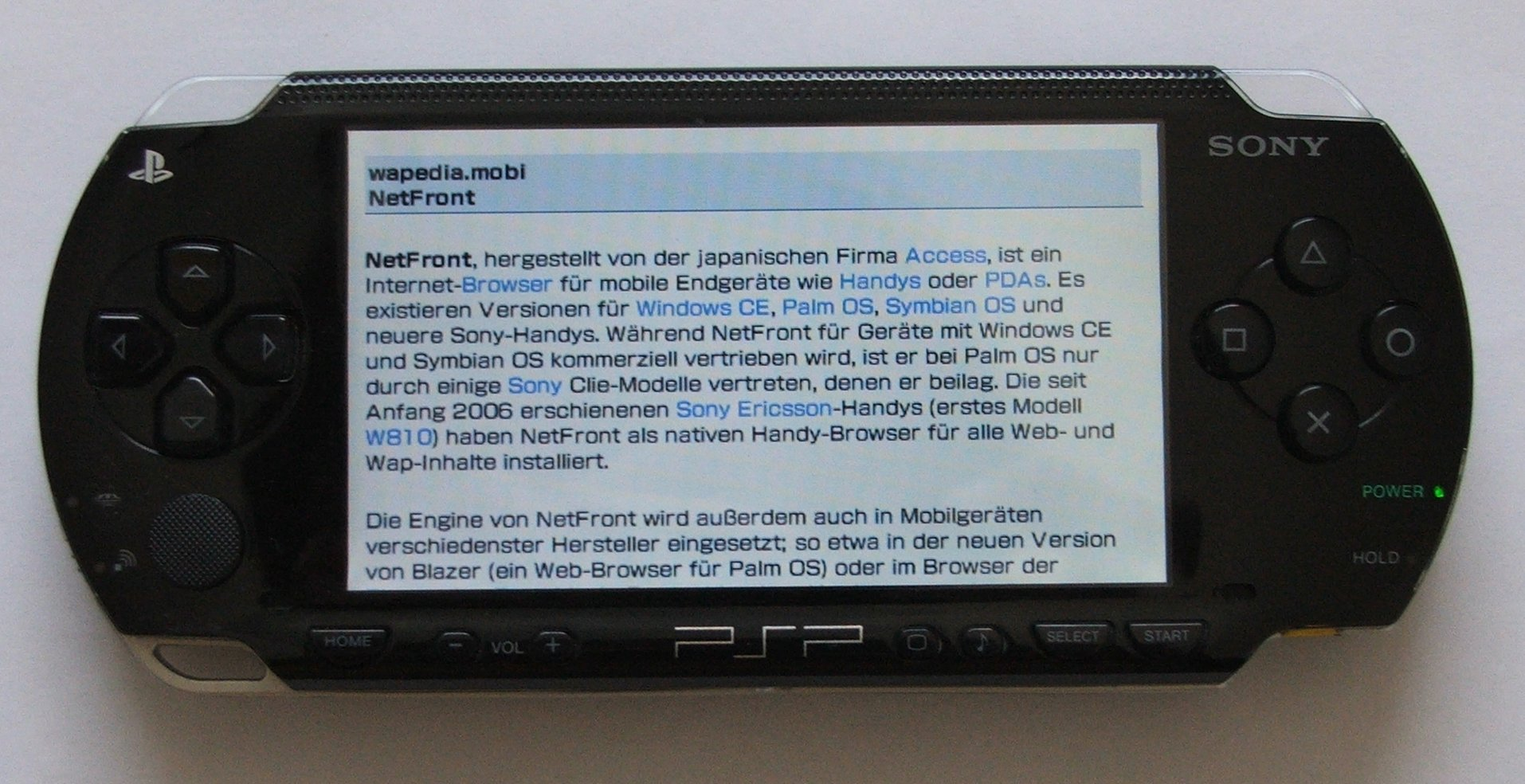
- The PlayStation Portable's web browser uses NetFront.
- Developer: Access Co., Ltd.
- Release: 1995
- Engine: NetFront, WebKit (some versions)
- Operating system: Linux (Access Linux Platform, Android, Qtopia, GTK+, etc.), Symbian (S60 and UIQ), Garnet OS, REX OS (BREW), VxWorks, Nucleus, ITRON, OS-9, OSE
- Platform: Windows CE, Wii U, PlayStation 2, PlayStation 3, PlayStation Portable, PlayStation Vita, Nintendo 3DS, Kindle, Nintendo Switch, Sega Dreamcast, Nintendo Switch 2
- Type: Mobile browser
- License: Proprietary
- Website: Official website

NetFront Browser is a mobile browser developed by Access Company of Japan. The first version shipped in 1995. They currently have several browser variants, both Chromium-based and WebKit-based.

Over its lifetime, various versions of NetFront have been deployed on mobile phones, multifunction printers, digital TVs, set-top boxes, PDAs, web phones, game consoles, e-mail terminals, automobile telematics systems, and other device types. This has included Sony PlayStation consoles and several Nintendo consoles.

== Platforms ==
For Pocket PC devices, the browser converted web page tables to a vertical display, eliminating the need to scroll horizontally. The engine also was used in Japanese and European versions of the Dreamcast browser and the Japanese PSBBN expansion for PlayStation 2.

The Nintendo 3DS Internet browser uses the WebKit-based NetFront Browser NX according to the documentation included with the browser. The PlayStation 3 Internet web browser received a major upgrade with firmware version 4.10, upgrading to a custom version of the NetFront browser, adding limited HTML5 support and improved JavaScript speeds. The Wii U console is also equipped with NetFront NX, and GPL source code is available. The Amazon Kindle e-reader uses NetFront as its web browser. Nintendo's latest console, the Nintendo Switch 2, is also using NetFront NX.

== Performance ==
Netfront 3.5 had an Acid3 score of 11/100 and NetFront Browser NX v1.0 had an Acid3 score of 92/100.

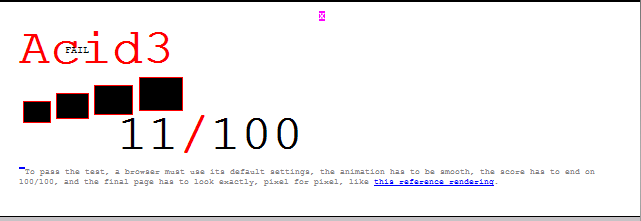
Acid3 in NetFront 3.5
(PlayStation Portable)

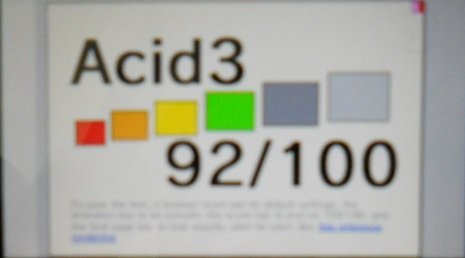
Nintendo 3DS Acid3 test results

== See also ==
- Nintendo 3DS § Internet browser
