= Access Systems Americas =

ACCESS Systems Americas, Inc.
- Formerly: PalmSource
- Type: Subsidiary
- Industry: Computer hardware and Software
- Headquarters: United States
- Products: Information technology solutions Software
- Parent: Palm, Inc. (2002–2003); Access Co. (2005–present)

PalmSource's logo

ACCESS Systems Americas, Inc. (formerly PalmSource) is a subsidiary of ACCESS which develops the Palm OS PDA operating system and its successor, the Access Linux Platform, as well as BeOS. PalmSource was spun off from Palm Computing, Inc.

Palm OS runs on 38 million devices that have been sold since 1996 from hardware manufacturers including Palm, Inc., Samsung, IBM, Aceeca, AlphaSmart, Fossil, Inc., Garmin, Group Sense PDA (Xplore), Kyocera, PiTech, Sony, and Symbol. PalmSource also develops several programs for the Palm OS, and as of December 2005, PalmGear claims to offer 28,769 software titles of varying genres. Palm OS software programs can also be downloaded from CNET, PalmSource, Handango, and Tucows.

PalmSource also owns BeOS, which it purchased from Be Inc. in August 2001.

== History ==
In January 2002, Palm, Inc. set up a wholly owned subsidiary to develop and license Palm OS, which was named PalmSource in February. In October 2003, PalmSource was spun off from Palm as an independent company, and Palm renamed itself palmOne. palmOne and PalmSource set up a holding company that owned the Palm trademark.

In January 2004, PalmSource announced the successor to classic Palm OS called Palm OS Cobalt. However, it failed to gain support from hardware licensees. That December, PalmSource acquired China MobileSoft, a software company with a mobile Linux offering. As a result, PalmSource announced that they would extend Palm OS to run on top of the Linux architecture.

In May 2005, palmOne purchased PalmSource's share of the Palm trademark for US$30 million and two months later renamed itself Palm, Inc. As part of the agreement, palmOne granted certain rights to Palm trademarks to PalmSource and licensees for a four-year transition period. Later that year, ACCESS, which specializes in mobile and embedded web browser technologies, including NetFront, acquired PalmSource for US$324 million. In October 2006, PalmSource announced that it would rename itself to ACCESS, to match its parent company's name.

== See also ==
- List of Palm OS Devices
