= Dict.cc =

Multilingual online dictionary

dict.cc
- Website type: English-German dictionary and other languages
- Available in: Multilingual, see Languages
- Owner: Paul Hemetsberger IT-Services
- Website: www.dict.cc
- Registration: free
- Users: 317636 (March 2026)
- Launched: 2002; 24 years ago
- Current status: active

dict.cc is a free, multilingual online dictionary. For offline use the dictionaries can be downloaded as text files and used in various programs on Windows, iOS, Android and Palm OS. Dict.cc GmbH have their main office in the Austrian capital city of Vienna.

== History ==
The website was put on the internet in the year 2002 by Austrian Paul Hemetsberger. His vision was to make a dictionary available in hundreds of languages within a few years.

At the beginning of February 2005 Paul Hemetsberger allowed vocabulary lists to be downloaded under the conditions of the free GNU General Public License (GPL). Later in the year he changed to a proprietary license, which provides less freedom to the users. Nonetheless, he released all of those user-generated posts which were created under the former GPL-Licensed project into the lists.

== Vocabulary structure ==
Like some other online dictionaries, dict.cc allows users to suggest new entries. These new entries are not moderated (unlike in LEO, another online multilingual dictionary), but rather reviewed by the users through a multi-stage validation system.

== Languages ==
The biggest vocabulary sets currently consist of the German-English dictionary, from which the website developed. Since November 2009 additional language structures can be found, with translations into German and English. Nowadays, there are 50 further dictionaries; in the order of verified vocabulary extent (descending): Swedish, Icelandic, Russian, Italian, French, Romanian, Portuguese, Hungarian, Latin, Dutch, Slovak, Spanish, Croatian, Bulgarian, Finnish, Norwegian, Czech, Danish, Turkish, Polish, Serbian, Greek, Esperanto, Bosnian and Albanian.

The level of user interest in adding additional language is used to develop a wish list, where interested users can register with their E-mail address as future translators or employees.

== Data ==
The German-English dictionary, with over 1,180,600 translations (November 2018), is larger than the competing site LEO, and as of late 2018 was growing daily by about 300 entries. The other 50 dictionaries contain a total of more than 1.5 million (November 2018) verified translations. In addition, there are over 1 million inflected forms.

Furthermore, there is a forum with over 33,000 contributing users and over 770,000 posts within the website. As of March 2015 it ran on 11 servers in parallel, in order to process the 150 million monthly pageviews.

== Speech output ==
For every entry in the German and English language dictionaries, an automatic speech output can be generated through Speech synthesis. Nevertheless, users have the possibility to add their own speech recording for every entry. As of November 2017 there were over 1 million verified spoken recordings from native speakers.

== Vocabulary trainer ==
In order to improve language knowledge, a vocabulary trainer is also provided, which is complemented with entries from the dictionary. Moreover, it is possible for every user to make their vocabulary lists publicly accessible, whereby a large choice of vocabulary questions is available.
