= Memoware =

Memoware is a term originally coined in 1996 for data formatted for the Memopad application that was shipped with the original USRobotics Pilot (now Palm) Personal Digital Assistant. The MemoWare website was started shortly afterward by Craig Froehle as a central repository for memoware, and now hosts thousands of documents (in various formats) for Palm OS devices and other handhelds.

== History ==
The idea and the name came out of discussions on a Pilot-related email list (managed by Tracy R. Reed) in August and September 1996.

Many list-members created Memoware over the next days and months, notably Mark Carden (periodic table of elements, international data), Jon Flemming (US Presidents), John Komdat (US States), Bill Raynor (statistical tables, Quake video game cheats), Bradley Batt (sports results), and others.

Craig's "memoware" database grew rapidly, as he predicted, moving to the domain www.memoware.com in July 1997 and reaching 300 documents a few months later. He then continued adding documents and e-books, mostly donated by users, in various new mobile formats developed for Palm OS and other handhelds, including Doc and TomeRaider. By late 2001, MemoWare was serving over half a million individual users and nearly a million documents per month. In December, 2001, Craig Froehle sold MemoWare to Handmark Software. MemoWare was the oldest continuously operating website providing content specially formatted for Palm OS devices and other handhelds until Handmark ceased operating the site in September, 2014.
