= PRC (Palm OS) =

PRC (Palm Resource Code) is a container format for code databases in Palm OS, Garnet OS and Access Linux Platform. Its structure is similar to PDB databases. Usually, a PRC file is a flat representation of a Palm OS application that is stored as forked database on the PDA.

PRC files are also used by the Mobipocket e-book-reader (here sometimes referred to as MOBI format). The AZW format of Amazon's Kindle reading device is in turn a DRM-restricted form of the Mobipocket format.

On Palm OS, PRC files are used for applications, localized resources (overlays) and shared libraries.

== Structure of PRC file ==
In its essence, a PRC file is similar to a classic Mac OS application. It contains a PRC header, PRC resource headers and PRC resources.

PRC Header
PRC Resource Header
PRC Resources

=== PRC Header ===
The PRC header is located at the beginning of the file and contains meta-information on the file:

| Offset | Name | Type | Size |
|---|---|---|---|
| 0x00 | name | char | 32 Bytes |
| 0x20 | flags | integer | 2 Bytes |
| 0x22 | version | integer | 2 Bytes |
| 0x24 | creation time | 32bit integer - PDB Datetime | 4 Bytes |
| 0x28 | modification time | 32bit integer - PDB Datetime | 4 Bytes |
| 0x2c | backup time | 32bit integer - PDB Datetime | 4 Bytes |
| 0x30 | mod_num | integer | 4 Bytes |
| 0x34 | app_info | integer | 4 Bytes |
| 0x38 | sort_info | integer | 4 Bytes |
| 0x3c | type | integer | 4 Bytes |
| 0x40 | creator | integer | 4 Bytes |
| 0x44 | unique_id_seed | integer | 4 Bytes |
| 0x48 | next_record_list | integer | 4 Bytes |
| 0x4c | num_records | integer | 2 Bytes |

=== PRC Resource Header ===
For every resource (specified by num_records), there is a resource header containing:

| name | type | notes | size |
|---|---|---|---|
| name | char | Name of the resource | 4 bytes |
| ID | integer | ID number of the resource | 2 bytes |
| offset | integer | Pointer to resource data | 4 bytes |

=== PRC Resources ===
Every application contains al least a Code #0 resource with size information and jump tables, a Code #1 resource with executable code and data resources containing pre-initialized values of global variables in compressed form. Other resources that may be contained are forms, form objects, alerts and multimedia data, e. g. images and sounds.
