= Xcopilot =

Screen shot

Xcopilot is a Palm Pilot emulator that runs under Unix/X11.

It offers emulation of the timer, serial ports, touch pad and LCD along with Motorola 68000 emulation (m68k), specifically the Freescale DragonBall used in Palm Pilots until they switched to Intel XScale ARM processors (later DragonBalls were based on an ARM core not a 68000 but retained the same name, however were not used by Palm.) Xcopilot was originally developed by Ivan Curtis with contributions from Ian Goldberg, Jef Dionne, Kresten Krab Thorup, and Andrew Pfiffer based on the Windows program Copilot. While the original Copilot application eventually turned into the Palm OS Emulator, the Unix/X11 port branched off and enjoyed its own popularity. Written in 1997, Xcopilot was aimed at developers of applications on the Palm OS platform, freeing them from the drudgery of interfacing to the real hardware during the development process.

Xcopilot found a new role in the 2000s with the development of uCLinux, a version of Linux meant for very low-end microprocessors without an MMU. Today Xcopilot is no longer maintained but is still useful for trying out uClinux.
