= List of Palm OS viruses =

Viruses that target Palm OS based platforms

While some viruses did exist for Palm OS based devices, very few were ever designed. Typically, mobile devices are difficult for virus writers to target, since their simplicity provides fewer security holes to target compared to a desktop.

== Viruses for Palm OS ==
Name of Virus	Payload	Date Discovered
LibertyCrack	Deletes applications and files	August 28, 2000
PEMagic	Erases device ROM	Unknown
Phage	Deletes applications and files	September 22, 2000
Vapor	Hides all application icons	September 21, 2000
