= Xplore M98 =

Clamshell smartphone created by Group Sense PDA

The Xplore M98 is a Palm OS-powered clamshell smartphone created by Group Sense PDA.

As of July 2008, it was still available for sale in Hong Kong from retailers.

== Specifications ==
Feature	Specification
Form factor	Clamshell
Weight	109 grams (including battery?)
Dimensions	95.5 mm x 46.8 mm x 25.5 mm (L x W x T)
Talk time	2 hours (subject to local network service and usage conditions)
Standby time	100 hours (subject to local network service and usage conditions)
Battery	Li-POLYMER 3.7V B092 830mAh
Operating System	Palm OS 5.4 Garnet
GSM frequencies	GSM 900/1800/1900 MHz
GPRS	Yes, GPRS class 10
WLAN/WiFi	No
CPU	OMAP1510
Screen Resolution	176 x 220 pixels (internal), 96 x 96 pixels (external display)
Flash Light / Torch	Yes
Camera	1.3-megapixel, digital zoom and multi-shot functionality
Video recording	Yes
Voice recording	Yes
Multimedia Messaging	Yes
Video calls	No
Built-in memory	Yes, 32 MB RAM, 64 MB flash ROM
Memory card slot	Yes, TransFlash
Hot Swappable Memory card slot	No, battery must be removed first
Bluetooth	No
Infrared	Yes
Data cable support	Yes
Browser	WAP 2.0 XHTML / HTML.
E-mail	Yes
Music player	Yes, MP3 playback support
Stereo Speakers	No
Ringtones	Yes, Polyphonic, MIDI, MP3 formats
Vibrate	Yes
Handsfree Speaker	Yes
Offline/Flight mode	Yes
Synchronization	PC: Palm OS HotSync

== See also ==
- Brighthand Photo Tour - GSPDA Xplore M28, M68 and M98
- GSL Xplore M98 Product Info Page
- Mobile Phone Accessories
- Review By The Inquirer
