= Graffiti 2 =

Revised version of the original Palm OS handwriting system Graffiti

Graffiti 2 Alphabet. The two-stroke characters, as well as Q, differ from the original Graffiti.

"Graffiti 2 Powered by Jot" was introduced in 2003 as a revised version of the original Palm OS handwriting system Graffiti. In January 2003, PalmSource announced the change explaining that Graffiti 2 was based on Jot by Communication Intelligence Corporation (CIC) and would replace the original version of Graffiti. Graffiti 2 made its debut in Palm OS 4.1.2 for Motorola DragonBall-based handhelds and in Palm OS Garnet 5.2 for ARM-based ones.

== History ==
The primary reason for the change was that in April 1997 Xerox had sued PalmSource, Inc. over its use of Graffiti. After a legal fight lasting a number of years, and despite the dismissal of the case by a federal judge, Xerox won a reversal late in 2001 in the U.S. Court of Appeals.

As part of their press for the new handwriting recognition system, PalmSource said that Jot and Graffiti 2 more closely followed the standard ways of drawing letters and numbers than the original Graffiti did; they also said that lowering the learning curve would attract more new users to the platform. The change, on the other hand, alienated many long-time Palm users who were already happy with the previous version of Graffiti which they claimed was much easier to use (though perhaps not to learn).

A prominent issue cited by detractors is the number of stylus strokes required to draw a character. The original Graffiti recognition software required only a single stylus stroke for each alphanumeric character. Graffiti 2, however, required two strokes to draw some commonly used characters. This was perceived as extra work because the default settings for "i" and "t", the fifth and second most frequently-used letters in English, required two strokes. Preferences settings allowed switching variants for letters P, T, Y and $, but none of them could be switched back to single stroke.
