= Samsung SPH-i550 =

Smartphone

- Manufacturer: Samsung Electronics
- Availability by region: N/A
- Predecessor: SPH-i500
- Compatible networks: CDMA
- Form factor: Clamshell
- Weight: 147 g
- Operating system: Palm OS 5.4
- CPU: MX1
- Memory: 96 MB
- Removable storage: Secure Digital
- Battery: Li-Ion 830 mAh
- Rear camera: 3.15 MP
- Display: 320 X 320 px, 65,536 color
- External display: 128 x 96 px OLED

The Samsung SPH-i550 smartphone is the Palm OS-based successor to the clamshell style SPH-i500. The SPH-i550 has a 320 x 320 internal screen and an external OLED display. The camera takes 1 MP stills and can record video. A built-in MP3 player is controlled by external buttons without having to open the phone.

== Features ==
- Palm OS Garnet (5.4)
- MX1 CPU with 64 MB ROM / 32 MB RAM
- CDMA1x
- Clamshell form factor with dual displays, supports handwriting recognition
- 320 x 320 pixel, 2.3 inch, 65,536 color display (internal)
- OLED 128 x 96 pixel display (external)
- 3.15-megapixel digital camera with an LED flash
- Supports streaming media (VOD)
- MP3/MPEG4 player, controlled by external buttons without having to open the phone
- Web browser
- Infrared remote transmit
- Secure Digital (SD) memory expansion slot

A unique feature of the i550 is that all programs and data are stored in non-volatile flash memory so that a hard reset of the Palm device will not cause information loss.

As of April 2005, Sprint Corporation has cancelled plans for the SPH-i550. The i550 is offered by any carrier in the United States. Just weeks after Sprint canceled the phone, it was announced that the SCH-i539, a Palm OS-based smartphone by Samsung that is very similar to the i550, was available in China. The i539 is nearly identical to the i550, except that it uses a CDMA Removable User Identity Module (R-UIM), which is similar in function to a GSM SIM card.

Evidence on the Samsung Website indicates that a carrier in Mexico is in trials with the i550. The devices being tested all have the Sprint logo.

A petition asking Sprint to release the i550 was created, but there has been no response from Sprint yet.
