= CompanionLink =

Contact and calendar synchronization software

- Industry: Sync Software
- Founder: Wayland Bruns (CEO)
- Headquarters: Portland, Oregon, United States
- Website: http://www.companionlink.com/

CompanionLink is a contact and calendar synchronization software that syncs data across smartphone and tablet devices, computers, and web-based applications. The software is developed by Portland, OR-based CompanionLink Software, Inc. CompanionLink Software, Inc. also develops DejaOffice—contact management mobile app for Android, iPhone, BlackBerry, and Windows Phone—and a secure cloud-based sync service called DejaCloud.

CompanionLink Software, Inc. is recognized for developing one of the first 3rd-party synchronization tools for PalmPilot, BlackBerry, iPhone, and Android devices. CompanionLink software is best known for the wide range of devices it is compatible with. Wayland Bruns is the founder and current CEO.

== History ==
Wayland Bruns founded CompanionLink, Inc. in 1987. It was originally named JORF Company, becoming Tele-Support Software, Inc. in 1996, and then CompanionLink Software, Inc. in June 2000. As of 2011, the company employed 28 people and reported annual revenues exceeding $2 million.

CompanionLink was one of the first 3rd-party synchronization tools for PalmPilot, BlackBerry, iPhone, and Android devices. The company continues to evolve products for current platforms, operating systems, and software.

In August 2010, CompanionLink Software, Inc. released CompanionLink 4.0 with an updated user interface and faster sync support. One year later, in September 2011, CompanionLink 5 was announced after a public beta testing period. The company’s DejaOffice product was released in 2010, followed by DejaCloud in 2012.

== Products ==
CompanionLink syncs contacts, calendars, tasks, and memos between multiple databases and devices through direct USB connection or wireless connection. It works with Microsoft Outlook, Palm Desktop, ACT!, Salesforce CRM, Zoho CRM, Lotus Notes, Google Contacts and Calendar, Google Apps, Outlook Business Contact Manager, Highrise, Groupwise, and Infusionsoft.

DejaOffice is a contact and customer relationship management mobile application designed for business users. It synchronizes contacts, calendars, tasks, and memo apps for Apple, Android, BlackBerry, and Windows Phone smartphones and tablets. DejaOffice comes with its own productivity apps and offers USB, Wi-Fi, and cloud sync options. DejaOffice makes use of the Getting Things Done GTD approach, this allows one to focus attention on taking action on tasks, instead of on recalling them.

Cloud syncing for CompanionLink software is available through DejaCloud. DejaCloud is a business cloud service that keeps multiple databases and devices synchronized using a secure AES-256 encryption.
