= Palm Desktop =

- Developer: Palm
- Stable release: 6.2.2 (Windows), 4.2.2 (Mac) / circa 2008
- Operating system: Windows, Mac OS/Mac OS X

Palm Desktop is a personal information manager computer program for Microsoft Windows or Mac OS/Mac OS X, and can be used alone or in combination with a Palm OS personal digital assistant.

== Features ==
Palm Desktop contains four main modules which correspond to the four main modules of the original Palm Pilot:

- Contacts, analogous to index cards in a Rolodex card file or address book
- Calendar information as discrete or repeating appointments
- Tasks, sortable by priority, date or category in task lists
- Notes, for reference materials, memoranda or journal entries

Palm Desktop ships with all current Palm devices, and it can synchronize with a variety of devices using Palm's HotSync software. It is also available as a free download and can be used as a standalone application on personal computers. The Macintosh version has a much more sophisticated interface and many more options inherited from its history as Claris Organizer, including extensive printing capabilities for mailing labels and printed pages in various sizes of paper organizer.

== History ==
The original Macintosh and Windows versions were similar, until 3Com purchased Claris Organizer (a Mac-only product) from Claris and rebranded it as Palm Desktop 2. The four modules of Claris Organizer had influenced some of the original Palm developers, who were familiar with it from earlier work on the Macintosh.

Palm Desktop 4.2 for Windows was perhaps the only version of Palm Desktop which was removed from Palm's website. The company removed it because there were problems with its installer. It was replaced by Palm Desktop 4.1.4E, which is identical except for its improved installer.

Synchronizing with Palm Pre: some external companies made it possible.

== Last release ==
Palm Desktop 6.2.2 for Windows Vista was released around 2008. Users considering an upgrade to Palm Desktop 6.2.2 should know that this version does not support color-coding of events in the calendar application.

=== Compatibilities ===
Palm Desktop 6.2.2 works with:

- Multi-core CPUs
- The following Windows versions:
  - Windows 7, Windows 8, Windows 10 (64-bits systems needs to manually install drivers, see the incompatibilities section)
  - Windows Vista - Basic, Home Premium, Business and Ultimate (32-bit editions)
  - Windows XP Home and Professional (32-bit editions)
  - Windows Media Center 2005

=== Incompatibilities ===
This version is not compatible with the following:

- Computers featuring multiple CPUs
- 64-bit editions of Windows - 64-bit Windows devices were — for a long time — incompatible with USB cable sync, and must use other options such as serial port, infrared, WiFi or Bluetooth to HotSync. (The desktop software itself — either older version 4.1.4E or newest version 6.2.2 — works fine on Windows 7, 8, or 10 as desktop software without a remote device connected.) ACEECA developed a 64-bit driver for palm/garnet OS.
- Windows Server
- Microsoft Tablet PC

== Linux support ==
Palm does not provide a version of the software for Linux operating system, nor do they officially support the ones developed by third parties such as:

- ColdSync (stopped in 2005)
- Gnome-Pilot
- J-Pilot
- Kpilot
- PilotManager (stopped in 2006)

== See also ==
- Palm, Inc.
- Palm OS
- Palm (PDA)
- PalmSource, Inc.
