= StyleTap =

StyleTap Platform
- Developers: StyleTap, Inc.
- Initial release: April 27, 2005
- Stable release: 1.1.017 / 2009-11-14
- Operating system: Windows Mobile, Symbian OS, iOS, Android
- Type: Emulator
- License: Shareware
- Website: styletap.com

StyleTap is a Palm OS simulator/compatibility layer/emulator for the Windows Mobile/Windows CE, Symbian OS, iOS and Android operating systems. It emulates Palm OS 5.2 and earlier. Applications written for Palm OS show up as native programs and operate in the same way.

StyleTap works on the following platforms:

- Windows Mobile 6 Professional
- Windows Mobile 6 Standard
- Windows Mobile 5 for Pocket PC
- Windows Mobile 5 for Smartphone
- Pocket PC 2003SE (including full VGA support)
- Pocket PC 2003
- Pocket PC 2002
- Pocket PC 2000
- Various OEM customizations of Windows CE 4.2 and later
- Symbian S60v3
- Symbian S60v5
- Symbian^3
- Symbian Anna
- Symbian Belle (buggy - opening certain menus crashes the program)
- iOS v3.x.x firmware/iOS4 (requires Cydia)
- Android

== See also ==
- Windows Mobile
- Symbian
- Palm OS
- Palm OS Emulator
- iOS
- Android
