= MDCalc =

Online medical reference for healthcare professionals

- Industry: Healthcare; Technology
- Founded: 2005
- Headquarters: New York, New York
- Products: Medical Calculators
- Website: www.mdcalc.com

MDCalc is a free online medical reference for healthcare professionals that provides point-of-care clinical decision-support tools, including medical calculators, scoring systems, and algorithms. MDCalc is also a mobile and web app. The decision-support tools are based on published clinical research, and MDCalc’s content is written by physician authors.

== History ==
MDCalc was founded by two emergency physicians, Graham Walker and Joseph Habboushe, and provides over 500 medical calculators and other clinical decision-support tools.

The MDCalc.com website was launched in 2005. In 2016, MDCalc launched an iOS app, followed by an Android app in 2017. A 2017 survey estimated 65% of U.S. attending physicians and 79% of U.S. resident physicians use MDCalc regularly.
