= Access (company) =

Japanese software company

ACCESS CO., LTD.
- Type: Public
- Traded as: TYO: 4813
- Industry: Mobile software Smart TV software Automotive software Digital Publishing; Next Generation Networks
- Founder: Toru Arakawa and Tomihisa Kamada
- Headquarters: Tokyo, Japan
- Area served: Worldwide
- Key people: Kiyo Oishi (CEO); Michi Uematsu (CTO)
- Products: NetFront
- Number of employees: 657
- Subsidiaries: ACCESS (Beijing) Co., Ltd. ACCESS Seoul Co., Ltd. ACCESS CO., LTD. Taiwan Office; ACCESS Europe GmbH; IP Infusion Inc.
- Website: access-company.com

ACCESS CO., LTD. (株式会社ACCESS, Kabushiki-gaisha Akusesu), founded in April 1979 and incorporated in February 1984 in Tokyo, Japan, by Arakawa Toru and Kamada Tomihisa, is a company providing a variety of software for connected and mobile devices, such as mobile phones, PDAs, video game consoles and set top boxes.

The company makes the NetFront software series, which has been deployed in over 1 billion devices, representing over 2,000 models, as of the end of January 2011, and which has been used as a principal element of the widely successful i-mode data service of NTT DoCoMo in Japan. NetFront is also used by many consumer electronic devices beyond mobile phones, such as the Sony PSP and the Amazon Kindle, both of which have their web browsers powered by NetFront. In addition, the NetFront Browser and related products are used on a wide variety of mobile phones, including those from Nokia, Samsung, LG Corp., Motorola, Sony Ericsson and others.

In September 2005, ACCESS acquired PalmSource, the owner of the Palm OS and BeOS. The company used those assets and expertise to create the Access Linux Platform, an open-source Linux-based platform for smartphones and other mobile devices, with some proprietary parts including the user interface and some middleware. The Access Linux Platform 3.0 was released to the market in October 2008. Two of the world's largest operators, NTT DoCoMo and Orange, produced Access Linux Platform-based handsets until 2013.

In March 2006, ACCESS acquired IP Infusion, Inc., a provider of intelligent networking software, providing Layer 2 and Layer 3 carrier-class switching and routing as well as a comprehensive forwarding plane implementation supporting L2, L3 (IPv4 & v6), multicast and MPLS/Traffic Engineering.

ACCESS is active in open source-related efforts, including memberships in the Linux Foundation and the Linux Phone Standards Forum. In 2007, ACCESS employees presented at GUADEC (which the company also sponsored) and the Ottawa Linux Symposium.

As of January 2020, ACCESS employs approximately 657 people globally, with headquarters in Tokyo, Japan and facilities in the United States (Sunnyvale), Germany (Oberhausen), Korea (Seoul), the PRC (Beijing) and Taiwan (Taipei).

The company reported consolidated revenues of ¥9.4 billion for the fiscal year ending January 2020.

== See also ==
- Qt Extended
- Symbian OS
- Windows Mobile
