= Xplore G18 =

Group Sense smartphone using Palm OS

The Xplore G18 is a Palm OS-powered smartphone created by Group Sense PDA. At some time prior to the 2004 PalmSource developer conference, the code name "Zircon" was changed in favor of the official name "Xplore G18". At the conference, a Group Sense PDA representative stated that the G18 is already available to the public in Hong Kong, and that it would be made available in the United States later in 2004.

Some notable features of the G18 are as follows.

- A 320-by-240-pixel camera
- A 160-by-240-pixel screen

== Distributors ==
- Italy Xplore Distributor - WiDiNet
- Malaysia Xplore Distributor - Alpha-Tech Distribution Sdn. Bhd.
- Taiwan Xplore Distributor - Instant-Dict Co., Ltd.
