= Medical calculator =

Computer software for health indices

A medical calculator is a type of medical computer software, whose purpose is to allow easy calculation of various scores and indices, presenting the user with a friendly interface that hides the complexity of the formulas. Most offer further information such as result interpretation guides and medical literature references. Generally, such calculators are intended for use by health care professionals, and use by the general public maybe discouraged.

Medical calculators arose because modern medicine makes frequent use of scores and indices that put physicians' memory and calculation skills to the test. The advent of personal computers, the Internet and Web, and more recently personal digital assistants (PDAs) have formed an environment conducive to their development, spread and use.

== Types ==
=== Online ===
Various websites, including Wikipedia and MDCalc, are available that provide calculations from a browser based input form.

=== Hardware ===
Purpose-built devices for specific medical calculations are available from various commercial sources. There are two ways to make a calculator using an array that looks up an answer based on a large array of data or where the calculator computes the answer using a mathematical equation.

=== Apps ===
Software-based medical calculators are available for various platforms, including the iPhone and Android. Handheld battery powered portable units are available and can be manufactured in smaller quantities than before thanks to OTP (one Time Programmable) chips.
