= Group Sense PDA =

Chinese company

Group Sense PDA Limited (GSPDA) SEHK: 601 is a Chinese manufacturer of personal digital assistants and smartphones. GSPDA is owned by Group Sense and is based in Hong Kong. One of its product lines is the Xplore series of personal digital assistants.

It was revealed during July 2008 that GSPDA had removed references to its Palm OS Xplore devices from its websites. Also purged were details of Jasper, a Java-based device powered by a platform from SavaJe.

== Product List ==
- Xplore G18—Palm OS 4.1
- Xplore G88—Palm OS 4.1
- Xplore M28—Palm OS 5.4
- Xplore M68—Palm OS 5.4
- Xplore M98—Palm OS 5.4
- Xplore M70—Palm OS 5.4
- Mobile phones—3G

Laptops—OS Gps Games
