= AppForge =

AppForge, Inc. was a software company headquartered in Atlanta, Georgia, providing mobile application development services as well as CrossFire, a software tool simplifying mobile applications for Symbian, Windows Mobile, RIM BlackBerry, and Palm OS. Crossfire was a software plugin for Visual Basic 6 and for Microsoft Visual Studio .NET.

On March 13, 2007, AppForge ceased operations and has been assigned to the benefit of the creditors so it could begin bidding. All AppForge License validation servers went dark on April 2, and all development platforms became invalid leaving its customers high and dry. Eight days later, the developers forum and shop parts of the website went offline. On April 12, the AppForge URL was redirected to Oracle's website. The assets of AppForge, Inc. have been assigned for benefit of creditors to Hays Financial Consulting, LLC.

On April 18, Oracle announced they had purchased the Intellectual Property of Appforge, Inc. Oracle announced that:

“Oracle did not acquire the AppForge...former customer contracts, so Oracle does not plan to sell or provide support for former AppForge products going forward.”

== Effect of insolvency on AppForge CrossFire Users And Possible Solutions ==
AppForge used to sell an ISV version and a non-ISV version of Crossfire. The ISV version required yearly renewals of the development environment license. The non-ISV version required activation of the client license (the booster) upon deployment.

On April 2, 2007, ISV users were not able to update their applications once their yearly license expired. As of the same date, Non-ISV users were no longer able to install new software on their mobile units, or to re-install mobile units that ran out of batteries.
