= Graffiti (Palm OS) =

Shorthand input system for Palm OS

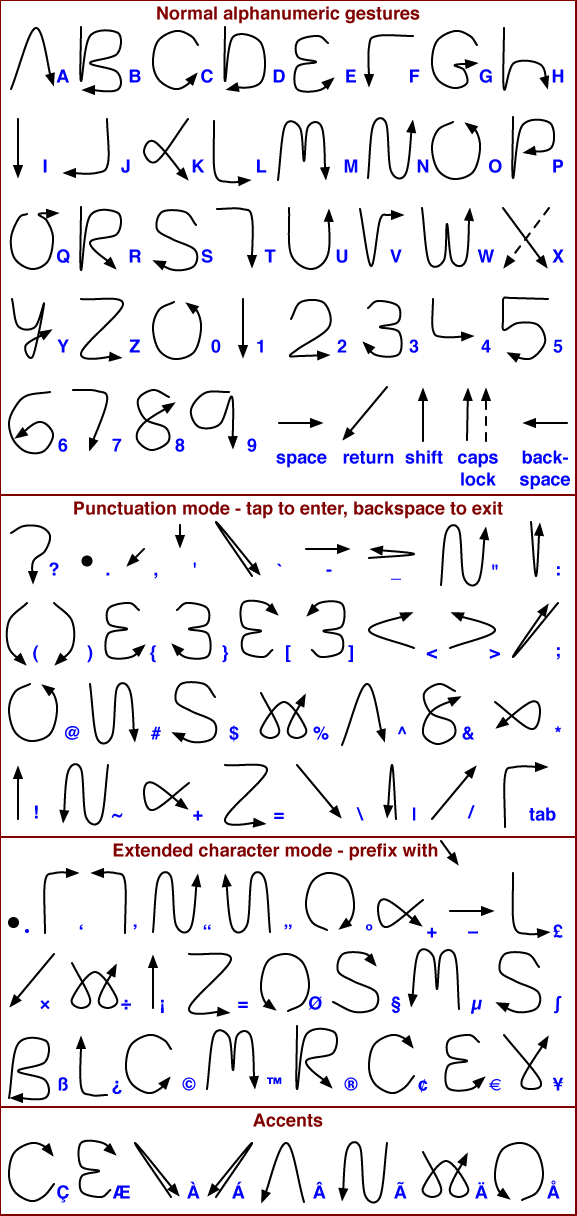
Gestures used by original Palm OS handheld computers

Graffiti is an essentially single-stroke shorthand handwriting recognition system used in PDAs based on the Palm OS. Graffiti was originally written by Palm, Inc. as the recognition system for GEOS-based devices such as HP's OmniGo 100 and 120 or the Magic Cap-line and was available as an alternate recognition system for the Apple Newton MessagePad, when NewtonOS 1.0 could not recognize handwriting very well. Graffiti also runs on the Windows Mobile platform, where it is called "Block Recognizer", and on the Symbian UIQ platform as the default recognizer and was available for Casio's Zoomer PDA.

The software is based primarily on a neography of upper-case characters that can be drawn blindly with a stylus on a touch-sensitive panel. Since the user typically cannot see the character as it is being drawn, complexities have been removed from four of the most difficult letters. "A" "F", "K" and "T" all are drawn without any need to match up a cross-stroke.

Some letters can be drawn with strokes other than the "official" ones. Two examples of these alternative strokes are the letters "V" (drawn the same only from right to left) and "X" (drawn the same as the letter "K" except reversed from right to left). These alternative strokes are frequently recognized with greater reliability.

== History ==
Graffiti was developed by Jeff Hawkins, who had previously created "PalmPrint" (the character recognition system used by the Casio Zoomer) to recognize natural handwriting. By using a simpler alphabet, computers could easily recognize handwriting. Hawkins believed that people would take the time to learn Graffiti just as people learn to touch-type. Hawkins recalled his insight: "And then it came to me in a flash. Touch-typing is a skill you learn."

The program was first released in 1994 for the Casio Zoomer PDA, while the first device to have the program preinstalled were the Pilot 1000 and 5000 PDAs, both of which were released in 1996.

Hawkins also envisioned a single area for writing letters on top of each other.

Hawkins called this system "PowerPalmPrint" or P3. Other engineers at Palm revised and expanded the alphabet that Hawkins had created. Joe Sipher and Ron Marianetti created more characters and punctuation, and also designed a prototype of Graffiti that ran on a PC with a tablet peripheral.

In 2003, as a result of the Xerox lawsuit, Palm released Graffiti 2, which used gestures that somewhat resembled natural handwriting. Graffiti 2 was based on Communication Intelligence Corporation's Jot technology, which also provided letter recognition on Windows CE and other embedded platforms.

== Non-Palm OS versions ==
Graffiti was also implemented on the Apple Newton. In 2008, an unauthorized version of Graffiti was introduced for iOS (iPhone and iPad) devices. An Android version was released in 2010 by ACCESS Co., Ltd. of Japan, which acquired the rights to Graffiti when it acquired PalmSource, Inc. in 2005. The original patent expired at the end of 2016.

StrokeInput, is an Apple App for an additional keyboard that enables - when activated - Graffiti input for every text on iPhone or iPad.

== Lawsuit ==
The original Graffiti system was the subject of a lawsuit from Xerox, claiming it violated Xerox's patent relating to its Unistrokes technology (U.S. patent 5,596,656, granted in 1997). The Unistrokes technology was invented at the Palo Alto Research Center (PARC) by David Goldberg in 1993.

Palm later appealed the original court ruling, both on the claim it violated Xerox's patent and as to the validity of the patent in the first place. An appeals court ruled in favor of Xerox with regard to the original ruling, that Palm had violated Xerox's patent, but sent the case back down to the lower court to decide whether the patent was valid to begin with. In 2004, a judge ruled in favor of Palm on the patent review, saying Xerox's patent was not valid on the basis that "prior art references to anticipate and render obvious the claim." Xerox appealed the ruling. Xerox also obtained a US$22.5 million payment from Palm for retrospective licensing fees. Palm and Xerox agreed to not sue each other for seven years over certain patents, without publicly specifying which patents.

== See also ==
- Moon type — a writing system for the blind, using embossed symbols mostly derived from the Roman alphabet (but simplified)
- Nyctograph
