= Access Linux Platform =

The Access Linux Platform (ALP) is a discontinued open-source software based operating system, once referred to as a "next-generation version of the Palm OS," for mobile devices developed and marketed by Access Co., of Tokyo, Japan. The platform included execution environments for Java, classic Palm OS, and GTK+-based native Linux applications. ALP was demonstrated in devices at a variety of conferences, including 3GSM, LinuxWorld, GUADEC, and Open Source in Mobile.

The ALP was first announced in February 2006. The initial versions of the platform and software development kits were officially released in February 2007. There was a coordinated effort by Access, Esteemo, NEC, NTT DoCoMo, and Panasonic to use the platform as a basis for a shared platform implementing a revised version of the i.mode Mobile Oriented Applications Platform (MOAP) (L) application programming interfaces (APIs), conforming to the specifications of the LiMo Foundation. The first smartphone to use the ALP was to be the Edelweiss by Emblaze Mobile that was scheduled for mid-2009. However, it was shelved before release. The First Else (renamed from Monolith) smartphone, that was being developed by Sharp Corporation in cooperation with Emblaze Mobile and seven other partners, was scheduled for 2009, but was never released and officially cancelled in June 2010. The platform is no longer referenced on Access's website, but Panasonic and NEC released a number of ALP phones for the Japanese market between 2010 and 2013.

== Look and feel ==
The user interface was designed with similar general goals to earlier Palm OS releases, with an aim of preserving the Zen of Palm, a design philosophy centered on making the applications as simple as possible. Other aspects of the interface included a task-based orientation rather than a file/document orientation as is commonly found on desktop systems.

The appearance of the platform was intended to be highly customizable to provide differentiation for specific devices and contexts.

In the last releases, they went for a much more modern look with gesture support, and were no longer close to the Palm OS.

== Base frameworks ==
Similarly to Maemo, Nokia's internet tablet framework, ALP was based on components drawn from the GNOME project, including the GTK+ and GStreamer frameworks. A variety of other core components were drawn from mainstream open source projects, including BlueZ, matchbox, cramfs, and others. These components were licensed under the GNU General Public License (GPL), GNU Lesser General Public License (LGPL), and other open source licenses, meaning that ALP was a free or open environment on the software level.

Several components from ALP were released under the Mozilla Public License as The Hiker Project. These components addressed issues of application life-cycle, intertask communication, exchange and use of structured data, security, time and event-based notifications, and other areas common to the development of applications for mobile devices.

== Application development ==
The ALP presented standard APIs for most common operations, as defined by the standards for Portable Operating System Interface (POSIX) and Linux Standard Base (LSB). However, neither standard addresses telephony, device customizing, messaging, or several other topics, so several other frameworks and APIs were defined by Access for those.

Applications for ALP could be developed as Linux-native code in C or C++, as legacy Palm OS applications (which run in the Garnet VM emulation environment), or in Java. Further execution environments were supported via the development of a launchpad used by the Application Manager (part of the Hiker framework).

The ALP SDK used an Eclipse-based integrated development environment (IDE), with added plug-ins, as did its predecessor Palm OS development environment. The compilers used were embedded application binary interface (EABI) enabled ARM versions of the standard GNU Compiler Collection (GCC) tool chain.

== Security ==
The ALP used a combination of a user-space policy-based security framework and a kernel-space Linux security module to implement fine-grained access controls. The components for ALP's security implementation have been released as part of the Hiker framework. Controls were based on signatures and certificates; unsigned applications can be allowed access to a predefined set of safe APIs.

== Devices ==
Panasonic cellular phones with ALP:

- P-01E,
- P-01F,
- P-01G,
- P-01H,
- P-02B,
- P-03C
- P-03D,
- P-04C,
- P-05C
- P-05B,
- P-05C,
- P-06B,
- P-06C,
- P-07B

NEC cellular phones with ALP:

- N-01B,
- N-01C,
- N-01E,
- N-01F,
- N-01G,
- N-02C,
- N-02D,
- N-03D,
- N-04B,
- N-05B,
- N-05C,
- N-06B,
- N-07B,
- N-07E,
- N-08B

== See also ==
- Moblin project
- Palm webOS
- Ubuntu for Android
