= Personal digital assistant =

Multi-purpose mobile device

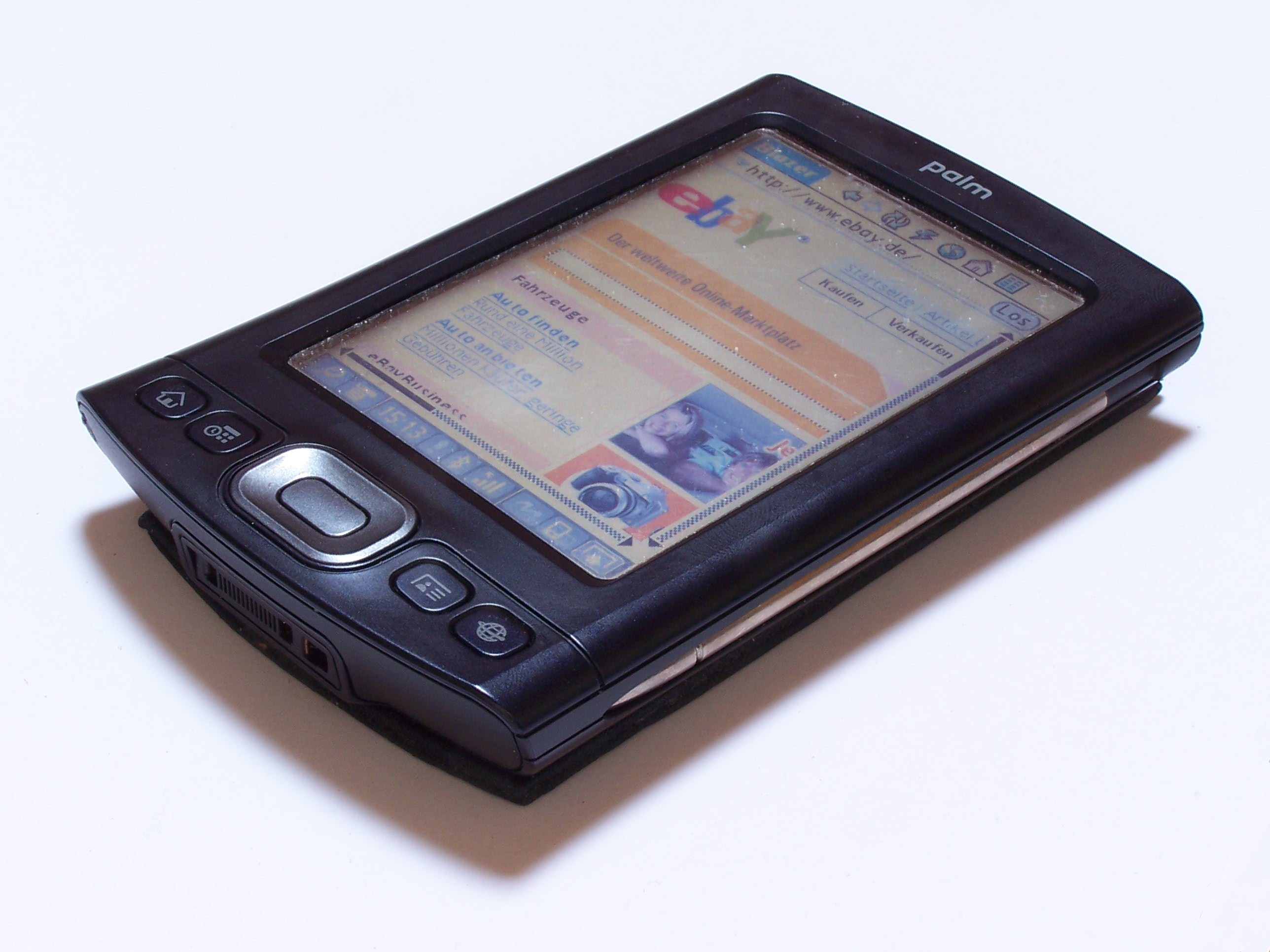
The Palm TX

A personal digital assistant (PDA) is a multi-purpose mobile device which functioned as a personal information manager. Following a boom in the 1990s and 2000s, PDAs were mostly displaced in the early 2010s by the widespread adoption of smartphones and tablet computers. In particular, smartphones based on iOS and Android took their place, causing a rapid decline in PDA usage.

A PDA had a flat-screen display; many later PDAs also had color displays, and instead of navigation buttons, resistive touchscreens, or even capacitive touchscreens. Most models also had audio capabilities, allowing usage as a portable media player, and also enabling some of them to be used as telephones. By the early 2000s, nearly all PDA models had the ability to access the Internet via Wi-Fi; these models generally included a web browser.

The concept of the PDA was eventually combined with that of the cell phone, the camera, and the GPS navigation system to produce the smartphone. To a lesser extent, the tablet computer also replaced PDAs, offering larger screens and newer operating systems.

== History ==
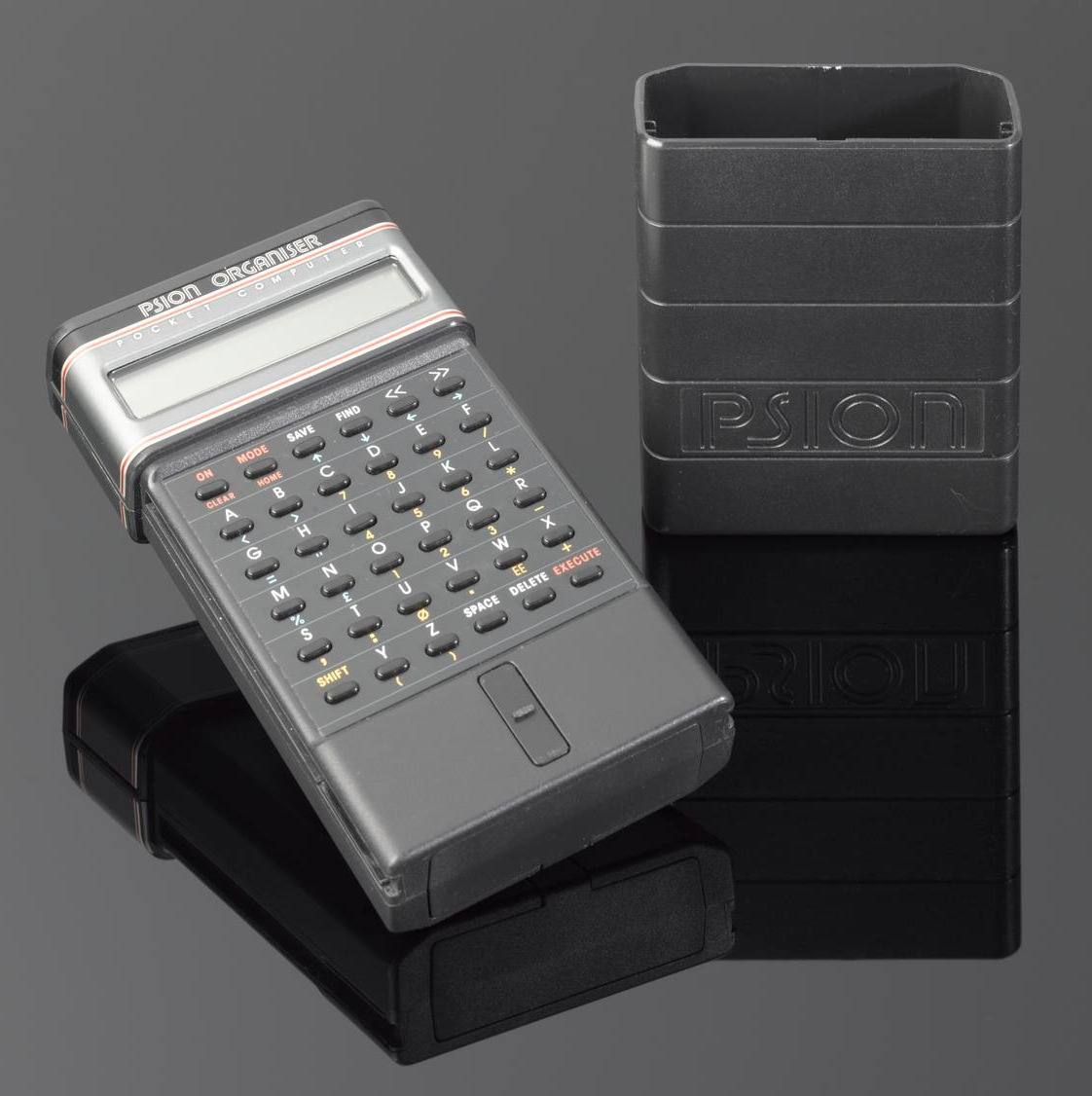
Psion Organiser I (1984)

The first PDA, the Organiser, was released in 1984 by Psion, followed by Psion's Series 3, in 1991. The latter began to resemble the more familiar PDA style, including a full keyboard. The term PDA was first used on 7 January 1992 by Apple Inc. CEO John Sculley at the Consumer Electronics Show in Las Vegas, Nevada, referring to the Apple Newton.

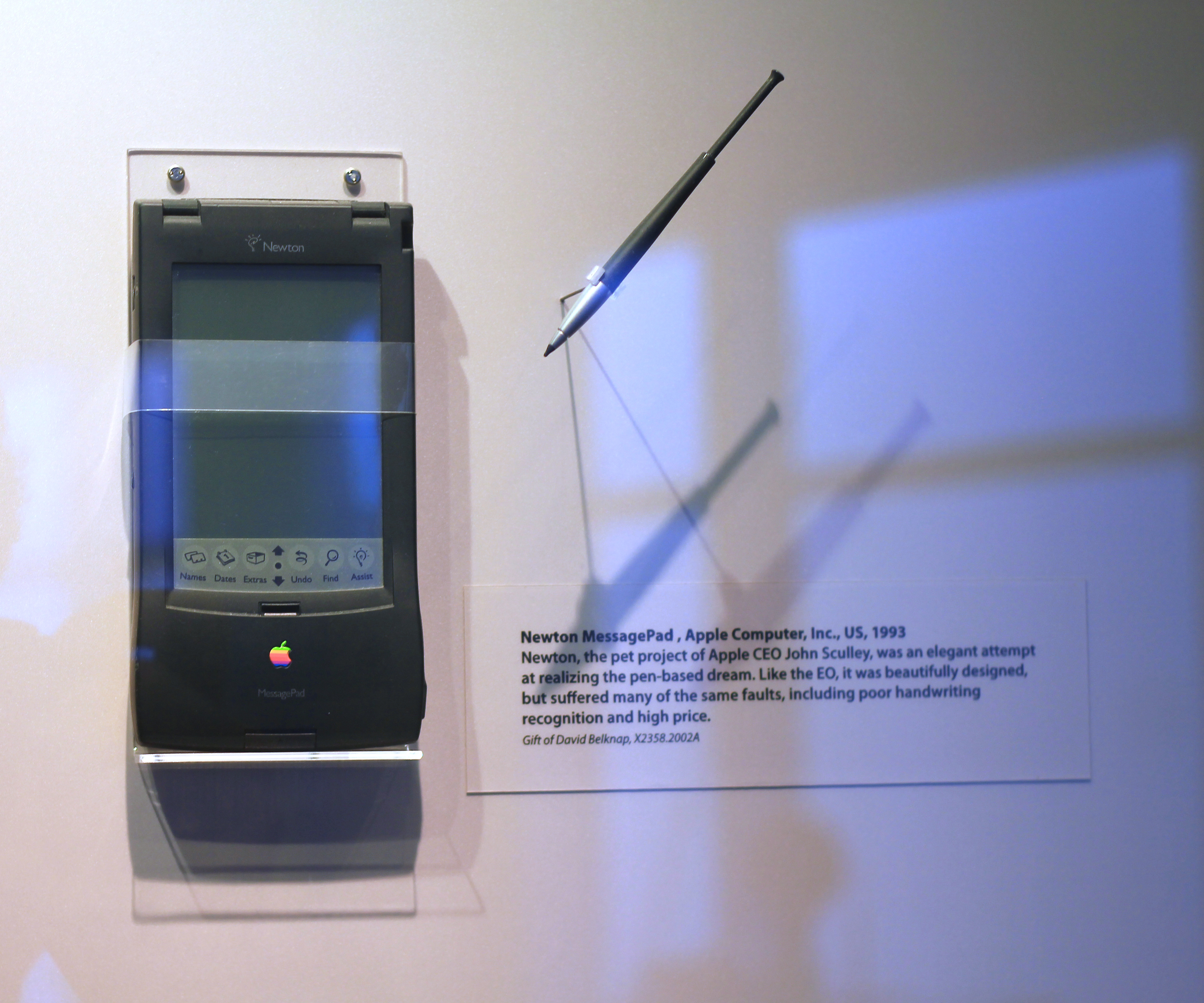
Apple Newton MessagePad (1993) – Computer History Museum

In 1994, IBM introduced the first PDA with analog cellular phone functionality, the IBM Simon, which can also be considered the first smartphone. Then in 1996, Nokia introduced a PDA with digital cellphone functionality, the 9000 Communicator.

Another early entrant in this market was Palm, with a line of PDA products which began in March 1996. Palm would eventually be the dominant vendor of PDAs until the rising popularity of Pocket PC devices in the early 2000s.

By the mid-2000s, most PDAs had morphed into smartphones as classic PDAs without cellular telephony were increasingly becoming uncommon. Devices such as the Palm Treo (resembling a bar phone) and the Kyocera 7135 (resembling a traditional flip phone) began merging the concept on a PDA with the concept of a cell phone. Some such devices even had built-in cameras and/or GPS capabilities, making them resemble smartphones more than PDAs.

== Typical features ==
A typical PDA has a touchscreen for navigation, a memory card slot for data storage, and IrDA, Bluetooth and/or Wi-Fi. However, some PDAs may not have a touchscreen, using soft keys, a directional pad, and a numeric keypad or a thumb keyboard for input. To have the functions expected of a PDA, a device's software typically includes an appointment calendar, a to-do list, an address book for contacts, a calculator, and some sort of memo (or "note") program. PDAs with wireless data connections also typically include an email client and a Web browser, and may or may not include telephony functionality.

=== Touchscreen ===
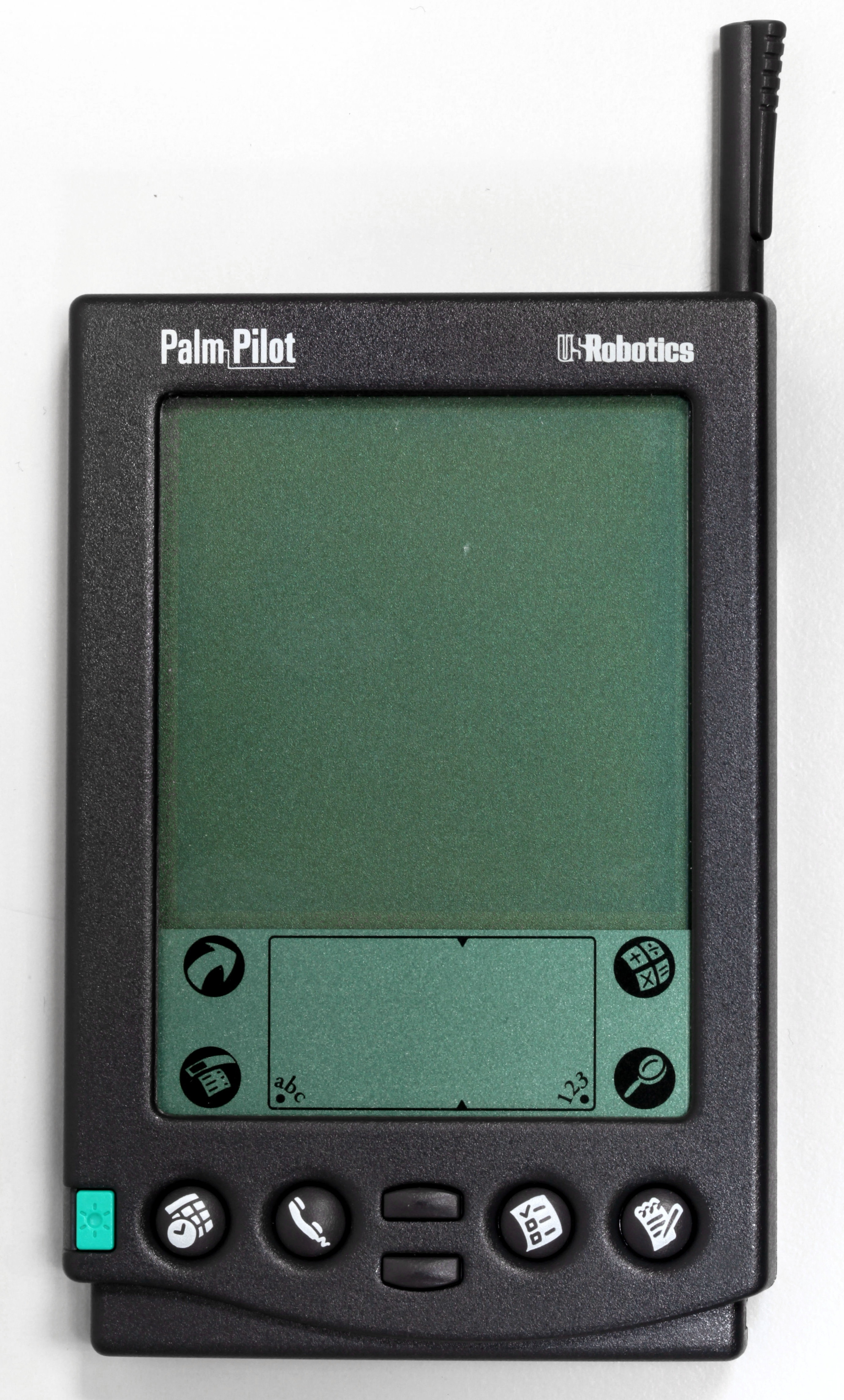
PalmPilot organiser on display at the Musée Bolo, EPFL, Lausanne

Many of the original PDAs, such as the Apple Newton and Palm Pilot, featured a touchscreen for user interaction, having only a few buttons—usually reserved for shortcuts to often-used programs. Some touchscreen PDAs, including Windows Mobile devices, had a detachable stylus to facilitate making selections. The user interacted with the device by tapping the screen to select buttons or issue commands, or by dragging a finger (or the stylus) on the screen to make selections or scroll.

Typical methods of entering text on touchscreen PDAs included:

- A virtual keyboard, where a keyboard is shown on the touchscreen. Text is entered by tapping the on-screen keyboard with a finger or stylus.
- An external keyboard connected via USB, Infrared port, or Bluetooth. Some users may choose a chorded keyboard for one-handed use.
- Handwriting recognition, where letters or words are written on the touchscreen, often with a stylus, and the PDA converts the input to text. Recognition and computation of handwritten horizontal and vertical formulas, such as "1 + 2 =", may also have been a feature.
- Stroke recognition allowed the user to make a predefined set of strokes on the touchscreen, sometimes in a special input area, representing the various characters to be input. The strokes were often simplified character shapes, making them easier for the device to recognize. One widely known stroke recognition system was Palm's Graffiti.

Despite research and development projects, end-users experienced mixed results with handwriting recognition systems. Some found it frustrating and inaccurate, while others were satisfied with the quality of the recognition.

Touchscreen PDAs intended for business use, such as the BlackBerry and Palm Treo, usually also offered full keyboards and scroll wheels or thumbwheels to facilitate data entry and navigation. Multiple touchscreen PDAs supported some form of external keyboard as well. Specialized folding keyboards, which offer a full-sized keyboard but collapse into a compact size for transport, were made available for multiple models. External keyboards may have attached to the PDA directly, using a cable, or using wireless technology such as infrared or Bluetooth to connect to the PDA. Newer PDAs, such as the HTC HD2, Palm Pre, Pre Plus, Pixi, and Pixi Plus, as well as devices running the Android operating system, included more advanced forms of touchscreen that could register multiple touches simultaneously. These "multi-touch" displays allowed for more sophisticated interfaces using various gestures entered with one or more fingers.

=== Memory cards ===
Although many early PDAs did not have memory card slots, later models had either some form of Secure Digital (SD) slot, a CompactFlash slot or a combination of the two. Although designed for memory, Secure Digital Input/Output (SDIO) and CompactFlash cards were made available that provided peripheral accessories like Wi-Fi or digital cameras to devices with software support. Some PDAs also had a USB port, mainly for USB flash drives. Some PDAs used microSD cards, which are electronically compatible with SD cards, but have a much smaller physical size.

=== Wired connectivity ===
While early PDAs connected to a user's personal computer via serial ports and other proprietary connections, later models connect via a USB cable. Older PDAs were unable to connect to each other via USB, as their implementations of USB did not support acting as the "host". Some early PDAs were able to connect to the Internet indirectly by means of an external modem connected via the PDA's serial port or "sync" connector, or directly by using an expansion card that provided an Ethernet port.

=== Wireless connectivity ===
Many later PDAs use Bluetooth, a popular wireless protocol for mobile devices. Bluetooth can be used to connect keyboards, headsets, GPS receivers, and other nearby accessories. It is also possible to transfer files between PDAs that have Bluetooth. Multiple PDAs have Wi-Fi wireless network connectivity and can connect to Wi-Fi hotspots. All smartphones, and some other PDAs, can connect to wireless wide area networks, such as those provided by cellular telecommunications companies. Older PDAs, from the 1990s to 2006, typically had an IrDA (infrared) port allowing short-range, line-of-sight wireless communication. Few later models used this technology, as it had been supplanted by Bluetooth and Wi-Fi. IrDA allows communication between two PDAs, or between a PDA and any device with an IrDA port or adapter. Some contemporary printers have IrDA receivers, allowing IrDA-equipped PDAs to print to them, if the PDA's operating system supports it. Universal PDA keyboards designed for these older PDAs use infrared technology, due to cost and a lack of wireless interference.

=== Synchronization ===
Most PDAs were able to synchronize their data with applications on a user's computer, allowing the user to update contact, schedule, or other information on their computer, using software such as Microsoft Outlook or ACT!. They could have that same data transferred to the PDA—or transfer updated information from the PDA back to the computer, eliminating the need for the user to update their data in two places. Synchronization also prevented the loss of information stored on the device if it was lost, stolen, or destroyed. When a PDA was repaired or replaced, it could likewise be "re-synced" with the computer, restoring the user's data. Some users found that data input was quicker on their computer than on their PDA since text input via a touchscreen or small-scale keyboard was slower than a full-size keyboard. Transferring data to a PDA via the computer was, therefore, a lot quicker than having to manually input all data on the handheld device.

Data synchronization was done through synchronization software provided with the handheld, or sometimes with the computer's operating system. Examples of synchronization software include:

- HotSync Manager, for Palm OS PDAs
- Microsoft ActiveSync, used by Windows XP and older Windows operating systems to synchronize with Windows Mobile, Pocket PC, and Windows CE PDAs, as well as PDAs running iOS, Palm OS, and Symbian
- Microsoft Windows Mobile Device Center for Windows Vista, which supports Windows Mobile and Pocket PC devices
- Apple iTunes used on Mac OS X and Microsoft Windows to sync iOS devices
- iSync, included with Mac OS X, can synchronize many SyncML-enabled PDAs
- BlackBerry Desktop Software, used to sync BlackBerry devices.

These programs allowed the PDA to be synchronized with a personal information manager, which may be part of the computer's operating system, provided with the PDA, or sold separately by a third party. For example, the RIM BlackBerry came with RIM's Desktop Manager program, which can synchronize to both Microsoft Outlook and ACT!. Other PDAs came only with their own proprietary software. For example, some early Palm OS PDAs came only with Palm Desktop, while later Palm PDAs—such as the Treo 650—have the ability to sync to Palm Desktop or Microsoft Outlook. Microsoft's ActiveSync and Windows Mobile Device Center only synchronized with Microsoft Outlook or Microsoft Exchange Server. Third-party synchronization software was also available for some PDAs from companies like CommonTime and CompanionLink. Third-party software can be used to synchronize PDAs to other personal information managers that are not supported by the PDA manufacturers (for example, GoldMine and IBM Lotus Notes).

==== Wireless synchronization ====
Some PDAs could synchronize some or all of their data using their wireless networking capabilities, rather than having to be directly connected to a personal computer via a cable (or dock/cradle). Devices running Palm's webOS or Google's Android operating system would primarily sync with the cloud. For example, if Gmail was used, information in contacts, email, and calendars can be synchronized between the PDA and Google's servers. RIM sold BlackBerry Enterprise Server to corporations so that corporate BlackBerry users could wirelessly synchronize their PDAs with the company's Microsoft Exchange Server, IBM Lotus Domino, or Novell GroupWise servers. Email, calendar entries, contacts, tasks, and memos kept on the company's server were automatically synchronized with the BlackBerry.

== Operating systems of PDAs ==
The most common operating systems pre-installed on PDAs were:

- Palm OS
- Microsoft Windows Mobile (Pocket PC) with a Windows CE kernel

Other, rarely used operating systems:

- EPOC, then Symbian OS (in mobile phone + PDA combinations)
- Linux (e.g. VR3, iPAQ, Sharp Zaurus PDA, Opie, GPE, Familiar Linux etc.)
- Newton
- QNX (also on iPAQ)

== Automobile navigation ==
Some PDAs included Global Positioning System (GPS) receivers. Other PDAs were compatible with external GPS-receiver add-ons that used the PDA's processor and screen to display location information. PDAs with GPS functionality could be used for automotive navigation. Integrated PDAs were fitted as standard on new cars throughout the 2000s. Some PDA-based GPS could also display traffic conditions, perform dynamic routing, and show known locations of roadside mobile radar guns. TomTom, Garmin, and iGO offered GPS navigation software for PDAs.

== Ruggedized ==
Some businesses and government organizations relied upon rugged PDAs, sometimes known as enterprise digital assistants (EDAs) or mobile computers, for mobile data applications. These PDAs had features that made them more robust and able to handle inclement weather, jolts, and moisture. EDAs would often have extra features for data capture, such as barcode readers, radio-frequency identification (RFID) readers, magnetic stripe card readers, or smart card readers. These features were designed to facilitate the use of these devices to scan product or item codes.

Typical applications included:

- Access control and security
- Capital asset maintenance
- Facilities maintenance and management
- Infection control audit and surveillance within healthcare environments
- Medical treatment and recordkeeping in hospitals
- Meter reading by utilities
- Military
- Package delivery
- Park and wildlife rangers
- Parking enforcement
- Route accounting
- Supply chain management in warehouses
- Taxicab allocation and routing
- Waiter and waitress applications in restaurants and hospitality venues
- Wildlife biologists

== Educational uses ==
PDAs and handheld devices were allowed in multiple classrooms for digital note-taking. Students could spell-check, modify, and amend their class notes on a PDA. Some educators distributed course material through the Internet or infrared file-sharing functions of the PDA. Textbook publishers released e-books, which could be uploaded directly to a PDA, reducing the number of textbooks students were required to carry. Brighton and Sussex Medical School in the UK was the first medical school to provide wide scale use of PDAs to its undergraduate students. The learning opportunities provided by having PDAs complete with a suite of key medical texts were studied with results showing that learning occurred in context with timely access to key facts and through consolidation of knowledge via repetition. The PDA was an important addition to the learning ecology rather than a replacement. Software companies also developed PDA programs to meet the instructional needs of educational institutions, such as dictionaries, thesauri, word processing software, encyclopedias, webinars and digital lesson planners.

== Recreational uses ==
PDAs were used by music enthusiasts to play a variety of music file formats. Many PDAs include the functionality of an MP3 player. Road rally enthusiasts can use PDAs to calculate distance, speed, and time. This information may be used for navigation, or the PDA's GPS functions can be used for navigation. Underwater divers can use PDAs to plan breathing gas mixtures and decompression schedules using software such as "V-Planner". On-device games were also available in a wide variety of types and styles. Most did not require internet access, since many PDAs did not reliably have access to networks.

== See also ==
- Automotive navigation system
- Graffiti (Palm OS)
- Information appliance
- Medical calculator
- Pen computing
- Personal navigation assistant (PNA)
