= The Science of Managing Our Digital Stuff =

2016 book

- First edition
- Author: Ofer Bergman; Steve Whittaker
- Language: English
- Subject: Personal information management
- Genre: Non-fiction
- Publisher: MIT Press
- Publication date: 2016
- Publication place: United States

The Science of Managing Our Digital Stuff is a book about personal information management (PIM) written by Ofer Bergman and Steve Whittaker. It was published in 2016 by MIT Press. The book examines why and how individuals organize their personal digital information, as well as how new PIM systems can make this process more efficient. It has three parts: Personal Information Management: The Curation Perspective, Hierarchical Folders and Their Alternatives, and The User-Subjective Approach to PIM Systems Design.

In his review for the Journal of the Association for Information Science and Technology, William Jones found the book to be a comprehensive overview of Bergman and Whittaker's research work, but felt it was missing key details that would provide readers with a broader and more nuanced understanding of PIM. Dorothy Waugh's review, published in the American Archivist, praised the book as an "excellent introduction" to PIM, but noted that the studies cited by the authors were somewhat dated.
