= User-subjective approach =

The user-subjective approach is the first interaction design approach dedicated specifically to personal information management (PIM). The approach offers design principles with which PIM systems (e.g. operating systems, email applications and web browsers) can make systematic use of subjective (i.e. user-dependent) attributes. The approach evolved in three stages: (a) theoretical foundations first published in a Journal of the American Society for Information Science and Technology during 2003. The paper introduces the approach and its design principles (b) evidence and implementation was published in another JASIST paper in 2008. The paper gives empirical evidence in support of the approach as well as seven novel design schemes that derives from it. It has won the Best JASIST paper award in 2009.(c) specific design evaluation this stage has already begun with evaluation of the first user-subjective design prototype called GrayArea in a Conference on Human Factors in Computing Systems paper published in 2009.

== Theoretical foundations ==
The user-subjective approach takes advantage of the fact that in PIM the person who retrieves the information is the same person who had previously stored it. PIM can be seen as a communication between the person and him\her self at two different times: the time of storage and the time of retrieval. The PIM system design should help facilitate that unique communication by allowing the user use subjective (user-dependent) attributes in addition to the standard objective ones. PIM systems should capture these subjective attributes when the user interacts with the information item (either automatically or by using direct manipulation interface) in order to help the user retrieve the item later on.

The user-subjective approach identifies three subjective attributes – the project which the item was classified to, its degree of importance to the user, and the context in which the item was used during the interaction with it. The approach also assigns a design principle for each. The principles (discussed below) are deliberately abstract to allow for a variety of different implementations.

=== The subjective project classification principle ===
The subjective project classification principle suggests that PIM systems design should allow all information items related to a project be classified under the same category regardless of whether they are files, emails, Web Favorites or of any other format. This stands in sharp contrast with the present PIM system design where there are distinct folder hierarchies for each of these formats. The current design forces the user to store information related to a single project in separate locations depending on their format causing the project fragmentation problem.

=== The subjective importance principle ===
The subjective importance principle suggests that the subjective importance of information should affect its degree of visual salience and accessibility: important information items should be highly visible and accessible as they are more likely to be retrieved (the promotion principle) and those of lower importance should be demoted (i.e. making them less visible) so as not to distract the user (the demotion principle). While the promotion principle is not new and has been widely applied in PIM system design, the demotion principle is novel and has been applied only sporadically in these systems. Currently these systems allow only two options: keeping information (where unneeded information items could clutter folders and obscure the target item) and deleting it (where there is a risk that the item will not be there when needed). Demotion suggests a third option where the item is less visible so it doesn’t distract the user but is kept within its original context in case the user would need it after all.

=== The subjective context principle ===
The subjective context principle suggests that PIM systems should allow users retrieve their information items in the same context that they had previously used in order to bridge the time gap between these two events. By "context" the approach refers to other information items that were used at the time of interaction with the item, thoughts that the users may have regarding the item, the phase the user got to in the interaction with the item and other people the user collaborates with regarding the information item.

== Evidence and implementations ==
=== Evidence ===
The user-subjective approach was evaluated in a multioperational designed study which used questionnaires, screen shots and in-depth interviews (N = 84). The research tested the use of subjective attributes in current PIM systems and its dependency on design. Results show that participants used subjective attributes whenever design allowed them to. When it didn't, they either used their own alternative ways to use these attributes or avoided using subjective attributes at all.

Regarding the subjective project classification principle – many of the participants' recent files, emails and web pages related to the same projects (indicating that they were working on the same project using different formats), and they had saved files of different format in the same project folders. However, as design does not suggest storing emails and web favorites with files, users avoid doing so.

Regarding the subjective importance principle – users tended to retrieve their important information from highly visible and accessible locations offered by current design (e.g. by using the desktop), however since current systems offers no way to demote files of low subjective importance participants tended to use their own walk around ways for doing so (e.g. by moving them to a folder called "old" inside their original folder).

Regarding the subjective context principle – participants tended to talk spontaneously about the context of their information items during the interview.

These evidence imply that current PIM systems could possibly be improved if it would allow users to make more use of subjective attributes of their personal information.

=== Implementations ===
Each of the user-subjective design principles can be implemented in various ways. Moreover, as the approach is generative it offers PIM designers to use these principles in order to create their own user subjective designs. Below are design schemes that demonstrate an implementation of each of the principles. A more complete set of implementation examples can be found in the user-subjective website.

The single hierarchy solution – addresses the project fragmentation problem (the current situation where the users stores and retrieve their project-related files, emails and web favorites at different hierarchies) and implements the subjective classification principle by offering the user a single folder hierarchy for all information items. At the operation system level the users would navigate to a folder and find there all project related files, emails, web favorites, tasks, contacts and notes. This would allow them to retrieve all their project-related information items from a single location regardless of their formats. When looking at these folders at their mail box the users would see only their emails and only web favorites through their browser. The single hierarchy design scheme has not been evaluated yet.

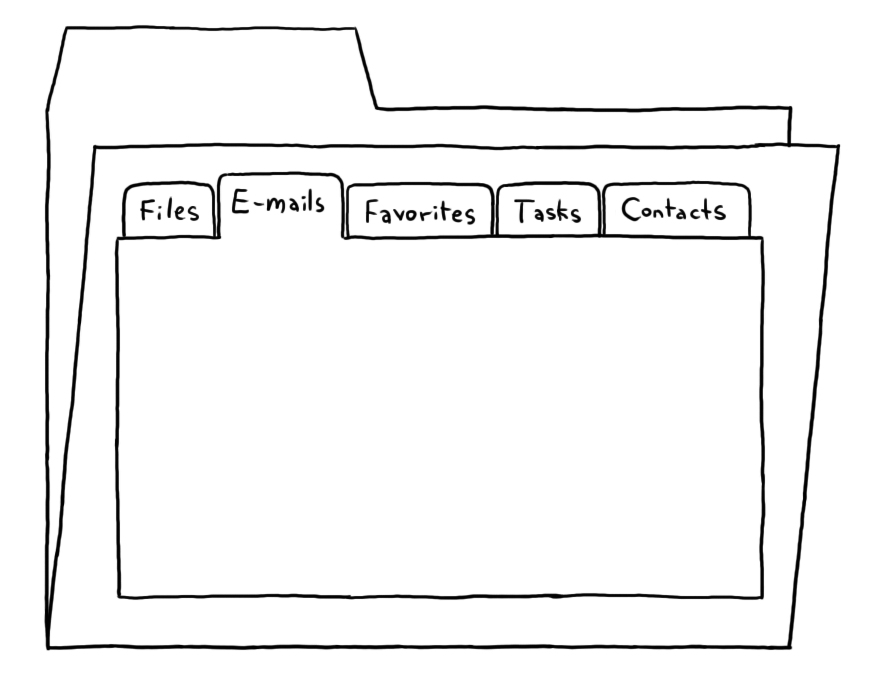
Single Hierarchy folder

GrayArea – implements the demotion principle by allowing users to move subjectively unimportant files to a gray area at the bottom end of their folders. This clears the upper part of the folder from file that are unlikely to be retrieved while allowing the users to retrieve these unimportant file in their original context in case they are needed after all. GrayArea design scheme was positively evaluated (see next section).

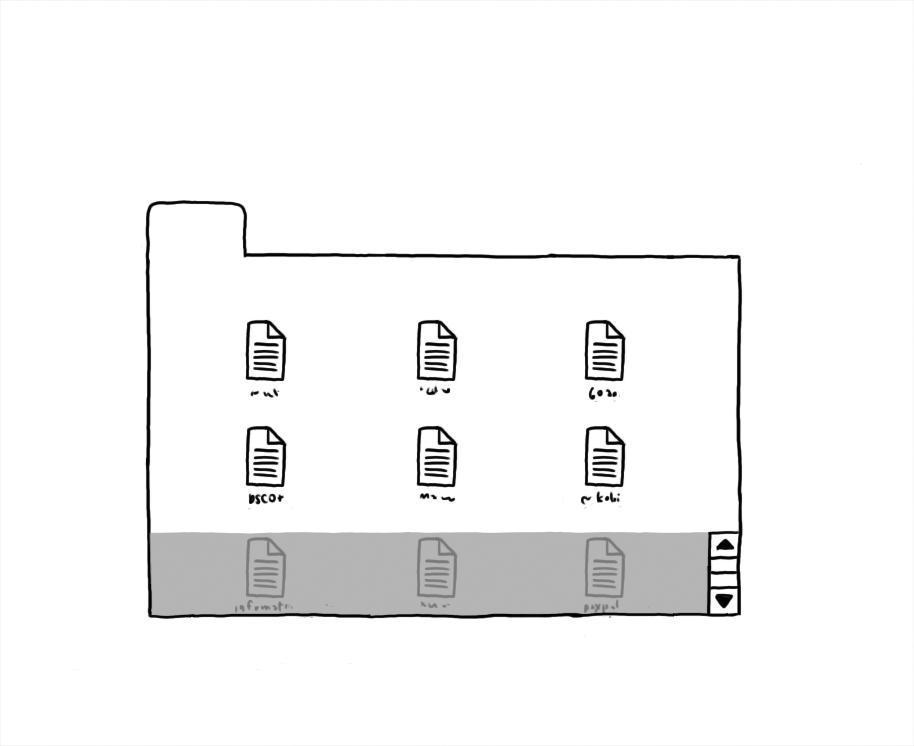
GrayArea design scheme

ItemHistory – is an implementation of the subjective context principle. It allows users to reach all information items that were previously retrieved while that information item was open. This design scheme has not been evaluated to date.

== Specific design evaluation ==
The evaluation of specific designs is the third and final step of the approach development. It had begun with the assessment of GrayArea.

=== GrayArea evaluation ===
GrayArea was evaluated by using a prototype that simulated the participants' folders but included a gray area where they could drag & drop their subjectively unimportant files. In the study 96 participants were asked to clean up their folders from unimportant files once with GrayArea and once without it. Results show that the use of GrayArea reduced the clutter in folders, that it was easier for participants to demote files than to delete them and that they would use it if provided in their next operating system.

These results encourage commercial implementation of GrayArea and the development and testing of other user-subjective designs.

== Chronological development ==
The user-subjective approach was developed by Ofer Bergman during his Ph.D. at Tel Aviv University supervised by Prof. Rafi Nachmias and guided by Prof. Ruth Beyth-Marom. The research was partially funded by the Sacta Rashi foundation. In 2003 they had published a paper titled "The user-subjective approach to personal information management" at the Journal of the American Society for Information Science and Technology. In 2004 the paper was recognized by The American Library Association as field representative when choosing personal information management as one of the “ten top technology issues and trends in today's libraries”. Later it was presented in scientific conferences including CHI, and ASIST and invited talks including at the MIT Media Lab, the HCI Lab, University of Maryland Human – Computer Interaction Lab and Microsoft Research at Cambridge.

In 2008 they had published another JASIST paper called " The user-subjective approach to personal information management systems design: Evidence and implementations". The paper has won the best JASIST paper award for 2009. According to the jury, “The paper was considered to be well-argued and documented, effective, intelligible, and potentially useful and applicable.”

In 2007 Dr. Bergman had finished his Ph.D. and continued working on the approach with Prof. Steve Whittaker under an EU Mary Curie grant at Sheffield University. They produced a PIM workshop paper about the approach at CHI 2008 conference, and a together with Ed Cutrell of Microsoft Research a full CHI paper titled "It's not that important: Demoting personal information of low subjective importance using GrayArea" in 2009.

In 2010 Dr. Bergman received a Marie Curie reintegration grant with Prof. Judit Bar-Ilan, Head of Information Science Department at Bar Ilan University, and became a faculty member at the department. The grant research plan called PIM includes further studies of the user-subjective approach.
