= William Paul Jones =

American information scientist

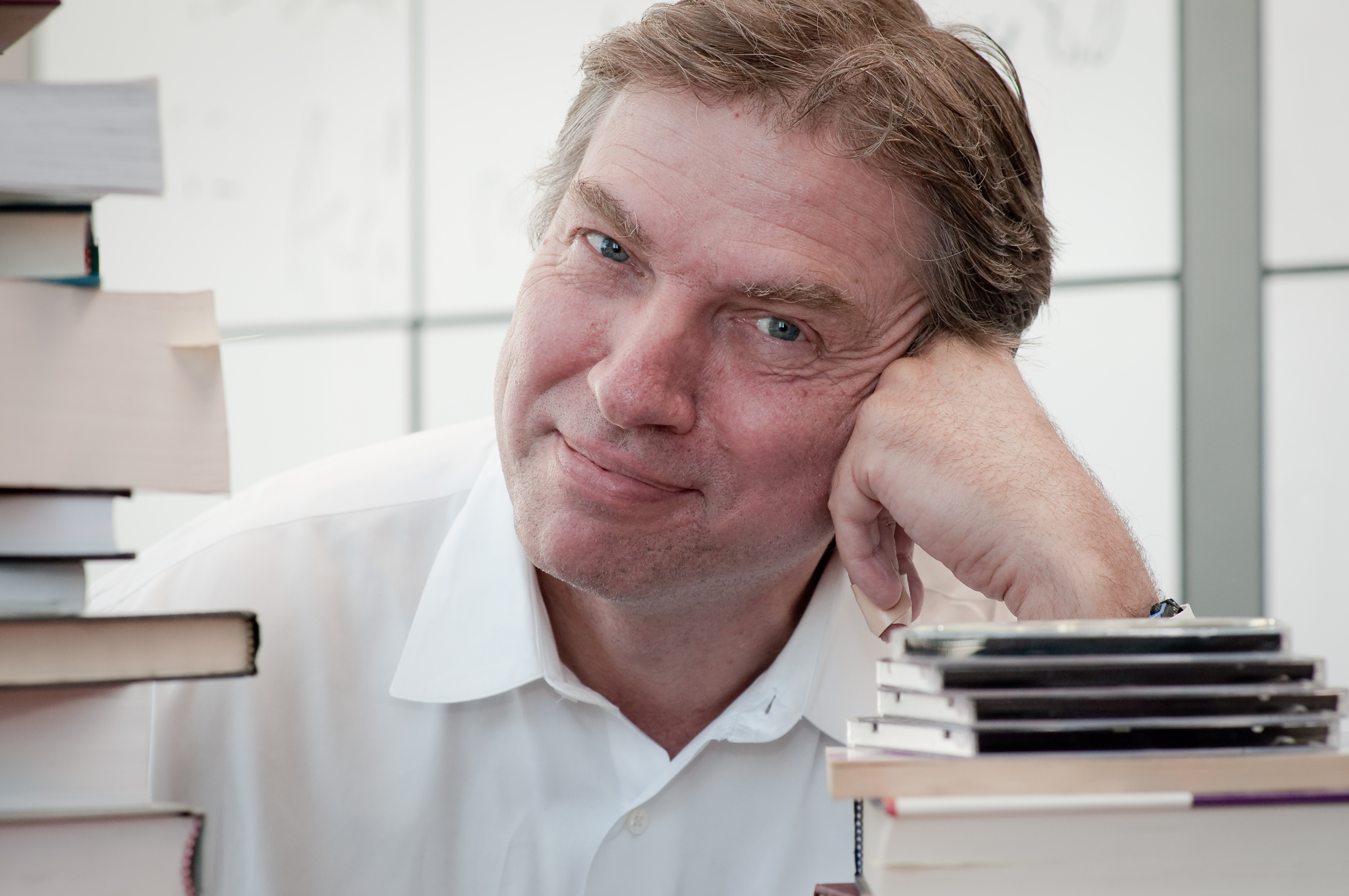
- William Jones at the University of Washington in 2009
- Born: July 20, 1952 (age 74); Chandler, Arizona
- Education: University of Kansas; Carnegie Mellon University
- Scientific career
- Fields: Personal information management Human-computer interaction Informatics; Cognitive science
- Workplaces: University of Washington; Microsoft; Boeing
- Doctoral advisor: John Robert Anderson (psychologist)

William Paul Jones is a pioneer of the field of personal information management (PIM). He has written extensively on the topic, holds seven patents relating to search and personal information management, and was noted for his early contribution to Planz. In 2005, he organized a seminal National Science Foundation (NSF)-sponsored event the "Invitational Workshop on Personal Information Management". His 2007 Annual Review of Information Systems and Technology survey Personal Information Management continues to be strongly cited. His 2008 book Keeping Found Things Found: The Study and Practice of Personal Information Management was well-received and followed by a three-book series, The Future of Personal Information Management, and articles in the Encyclopedia of Library and Information Sciences. This and other work describing a framework for understanding personal information management has been called "highly influential" by recognized researchers in the field of PIM. Jones' project Keeping Found Things Found was the subject of a 2004 New York Times article and a 2005 Seattle Times piece.

Jones’s current work focuses on how people can manage their personal information as they age in order to better achieve optimal health, wealth and the sharing of their legacy.

== Biography ==
Jones’s career spans institutions from business to research lab to academic. Jones received his doctorate from Carnegie-Mellon University in 1982 for empirical work and computer-based modeling of human memory. Beginning with his post-doctoral work at Bell Laboratories (later Bellcore) in Murray Hill his research turned to the relationships between human memory and computer-based systems of search and information retrieval. Jones subsequently worked in the MCC research consortium, then Boeing and finally at Microsoft before a 15-year affiliation as a research associate professor in the University of Washington Information School, where he is now Research Associate Professor Emeritus. Jones has co-authored over 40 refereed publications across the disciplines of PIM, human-computer interaction, information retrieval and cognitive psychology.
