= Planz =

- Stable release: 8.2 / June 11, 2010; 15 years ago
- Operating system: Windows Vista and Windows 7^{[a]}
- Type: Project Planner
- Website: http://kftf.ischool.washington.edu/planner_index.htm

Planz is an open source personal information manager developed by the Keeping Found Things Found group at the University of Washington Information School. It integrates e-mail, website links and content, computer files and folders, and informal notes into a simplified, document-like interface. Its purpose is to make the user's personal information easily accessible for use in planning everyday activities as well as larger projects. Planz is a research prototype rather than a commercial product.

== Purpose ==
Planz was conceived in response to research conducted by the Keeping Found Things Found (KFTF) group and elsewhere in the field of personal information management (PIM). The research suggested that people often have trouble organizing their digital personal information effectively, due to the fact that this information is both extensive and scattered and in many cases cannot easily be combined with other personal information. The developers hoped to accommodate the fluid and often informal nature of human planning by providing users an interface with powerful organizational features while at the same time leaving the structure of that organization to the user's discretion.

== Development ==
Planz was developed between 2008 and 2010 under the leadership of William Paul Jones, head of the KFTF group. The project was funded by the National Science Foundation. The software has progressed through several development versions, and as of 2010 Planz is not in commercial release.

== Design ==
Planz is meant to help people better organize their digital personal information by providing a central document linking related personal information around a conceptual theme, usually in the form of a project, such as a home remodel or a trip to Europe. The interface shows users a document in either a draft or outline view. This document can be edited to show all of a user's projects and tasks in a single, scrollable pane. Headings are used to represent high-level projects ("Re-model the house"); subheadings represent sub-projects and component tasks ("Kitchen"; "Decide on countertops").

Users have the option of working from within the Planz document, sending e-mails and creating documents without leaving Planz, in which case Planz dynamically links these new information items into the document. They also have the option of working from outside the document by dragging and copying files, e-mails, hyperlinks, and other items into Planz in the course of using other applications. The efficient transfer of information between applications was a key objective in the design of Planz, and the interface provides users with specialized tools to facilitate this.

Planz works in many ways like a word processor. Users can enter notes directly, and these notes can be arranged under numerous levels of headings, promoted or demoted, and moved up or down according to importance or priority. From a design standpoint, the document overlay of Planz makes the realization of additional features straightforward, which was an important goal of the development team.

By default, Planz presents a document that is anchored at a "Projects" folder^{[b]}. However, for any folder selected in the file manager, Planz can also be invoked as a right-click option to present a document anchored at this folder instead.

The document presented in a Planz window can be saved as an HTML file to be viewed in a web browser or edited in a word processor. Structure as well as content is preserved^{[c]}. The structure of a Planz document can also be exported for re-use either as a project template or for immediate use in another project. On the back-end, the file system headings and subheadings correspond to file system folders and sub-folders. Links within Planz correspond either to local files within these folders or to shortcuts which, in turn, can point to files, web pages or e-mail messages. The mapping from headings and links to folders, files, and shortcuts is one-to-one. Thus, Planz works with, and as an alternative to, the file manager. Users can create, modify or delete folders and files through operations initiated within Planz. In the other direction, a process of synchronization works to ensure the document views of Planz are current with respect to changes to the file system made outside of Planz.

Planz is designed to provide for the complete life cycle of personal information management from initial information capture, to information's timely use in completing tasks, to its eventual archival for clutter control and future reference.

== QuickCapture ==
QuickCapture is a pop-up utility associated with Planz. Its purpose is to quickly copy the content of a webpage, e-mail message, or document, while also linking back to the original. In Planz this information is structured as a note, and as a shortcut within the file system. QuickCapture is able to work independently from Planz. All communication is via a "XooML" middleware layer.

== Other key functions ==
Users can flag headings in Planz as tasks yet to be completed. Flagged headings can optionally appear as tasks or calendar appointments within a separate task management or calendaring application^{[d]}. Shortcuts to these headings can appear as sub-headings under a special "Today+" heading in Planz, as a task to do that day or in the otherwise immediate future.

"PowerD" support makes it easy for users to mark a heading or note as "done" or to "defer" for later completion. The heading or note no longer appears in the Planz document, but can reappear again later either at the user's request or automatically when a deferred date comes due.

Tasks marked as done are recorded in a journal. The journal is another file system folder with subfolders for year, month, week and day. Like any other folder, the journal can also appear as a single integrated document in Planz. Users can easily take notes and link in information in the form of pictures, videos, and documents, either as a "for the record" of past events or for planning future events.

== Integration with other services ==
Planz works with these other applications:

Microsoft Outlook: Users can flag a heading in Planz to create a task or calendar appointment in Outlook. They can click on a task or appointment to access relevant information. "The Days Ahead" allows them to track deadlines and appointments through dynamic interaction with Microsoft Outlook's Calendar.

Microsoft Office: New Word, Excel, Powerpoint and OneNote documents can be created from within Planz, or existing Office documents can be linked to Planz. Open documents can also be included in a plan.

Web browser: Users can links to websites in Planz.

Twitter: Users can tweet directly from Planz. Planz creates a link to that tweet, which can then be incorporated into a project.

== XooML ==
Planz and QuickCapture utilize metadata encoded in XML, called the Cross-Tool Markup Language, or "XooML" (pronounced "zoomul")^{[e]}. The XooML schema specifies the structure of a fragment of metadata as this might apply to any information item addressed by a URI.

Essentially, a XooML-compliant fragment (or, simply, a XooML fragment) is a bundling of attributes. A fragment can have zero or more associations which, in turn, can point to other fragments representing other information items. Fragments are a bundling of attributes. Some bundles apply to the fragment as a whole; some bundles apply to individual associations. Bundles at each level can be held in common (cross-tool) or tool-specific. A XooML-based tool such as Planz then builds a view as follows:

Step one is to retrieve the XooML fragment for the window's anchor URI and synchronize its metadata as needed with the item pointed to by the URI. The current version of Planz, for example, places XooML fragments in association with file folders in order to support the use of folder structure as a means of organizing not only files but also e-mail messages, web references and informal notes. In a step of synchronization, the folder's contents (as determined by file system calls) are compared to the information in the folder's associated XooML fragment. In cases of conflict, the fragment is modified to agree with the file system (i.e., the file system always wins). From the top-level synchronized XooML fragment, Planz builds a top-level Plan.

Step two is to recursively retrieve and process additional XooML fragments as needed. In Planz, for example, the subfolders and folder shortcuts of a folder appear within the folder's Plan as document-like heading associations. For each of these headings that were last shown as "expanded," Planz retrieves folder content information and an associated XooML fragment and then uses the results of their synchronization to determine the display of a sub-Plan.

Step three is to view completion is tool-dependent. In Planz, the process completes when sub-plans have been generated for each in a list of expanded associations encountered during the processing of XooML fragments.

== Notes ==
a. Planz is currently Microsoft Windows-based. However, through use of an XML-based XooML middleware layer (see discussion of XooML elsewhere in this article), the Planz approach readily extends to other file systems and other stores. b. "Projects" is created on installation of Planz as a sibling folder of "Documents" (or for Windows XP users, "My Projects"). c. In Microsoft Word, for example, headings are given a "style" of Heading 1, 2, 3... according to heading level within Planz. d. Planz currently includes special integrations for Microsoft Outlook. But the approach readily extends to other calendaring and task/time management applications. e. For the complete schema definition, see the KFTF website. (Note: Portions of this page have been taken from the Keeping Found Things Found website with full permission.)

== See also ==
- Personal Information Management
- Personal information manager
