= Group information management =

Group information management (GIM) is an extension of personal information management (PIM) "as it functions in more public spheres" as a result of peoples' efforts to share and co-manage information, and has been a topic of study for researchers in PIM, human–computer interaction (HCI), and computer supported cooperative work (CSCW). People acquire, organize, maintain, retrieve and use information items to support individual needs, but these PIM activities are often embedded in group or organizational contexts and performed with sharing in mind. The act of sharing moves personal information into spheres of group activity and also creates tensions that shape what and how the information is shared. The practice and the study of GIM focuses on this interaction between personal information and group contexts.

== Issues in the study and practice ==
Challenges of GIM that have been identified or studied in literature include situating individual workspaces within group contexts; the lack of conventions in sharing information; integrating and negotiating the varied approaches to organizing information; understanding information spaces that others have personalized; and retrieving information from shared spaces.

Improved software may help to alleviate some of these challenges, for example by analyzing group activities or improving Web services that support shared folders. Faced with the limitations of current software, users often prefer more traditional, ad hoc methods of sharing information, such as the use of e-mail attachments, and will even circumvent institutionalized software to do so. Therefore, the need for understanding and improving collaborative information tasks is clearly great, and work remains to be done. Other issues include:

- formerly private calendar entries could be used for ends other than scheduling meetings
- what users choose to reveal or conceal
- how their disclosure of personal information is related to the ends that they hope to achieve
- the ethics of 'counterfeiting' links or conspiring to garner 'inauthentic' recommendations to increase their stature in the system.
- complex questions of privacy and access and ownership. (user control, privacy and trust)
- user reliance on system defaults

== Tool support ==
- Group calendaring
- Social networking
- Patient medical records
- Collaborative filtering and recommendations
- Collaborative tagging
- File sharing and presentation
- Private family network applications like Stretch for Families.

== See also ==
- Collaborative software
- Computer-supported cooperative work (CSCW)
- Human–computer interaction
- Personal information management (PIM)
- Privacy
- The Presentation of Self in Everyday Life
