= Ofer Bergman =

Israeli academic

- עופר ברגמן
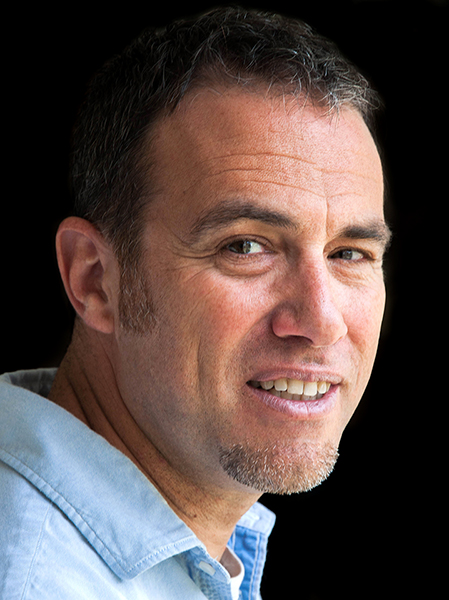

Ofer Bergman (Hebrew: עופר ברגמן) is an associate professor at the Department of Information Science, Bar-Ilan University. His research interests include Personal Information Management, Information behavior and Human-Computer Interaction. He has co-authored 40 publications, including the book The Science of Managing Our Digital Stuff (published by MIT Press), and Navigating Through Digital Folders Uses The Same Brain Structures as Real World Navigation (published in Scientific Reports).
