= Breakup Notifier =

Breakup Notifier was a web application written by product developer and programmer Dan Loewenherz that enabled its registered users to track the relationship status of their Facebook friends. An email notification was sent to the user when one of their Facebook friends changed their relationship status. The app was one of the most viral Facebook app's at the time of its release. It was mentioned in a skit on The Jay Leno Show and news of its popularity was published in Time magazine, The New York Post, CNET, and The Globe and Mail.

== Popularity and Facebook controversy ==
Breakup Notifier gathered 100,000 users in less than 24 hours of its launch and reached a user base of more than 3,000,000 in February 2011. Facebook then blocked the app.

Loewenherz later created an app named Crush Notifier, which differs from the original app in that users can check if they have a mutual crush. Breakup Notifier was later unblocked by Facebook and monetized.
