= Steve Whittaker =

- Awards: CHI Lifetime Achievement Award, SIGCHI (2014); Fellow, Association for Computing Machinery (2014); CHI Academy Member, SIGCHI (2008)
- Scientific career
- Fields: Human-computer Interaction; Cognitive Science
- Workplaces: University of California, Santa Cruz
- Website: Steve Whittaker's UCSC Website

Steve Whittaker is a Professor in human-computer interaction at the University of California Santa Cruz. He is best known for his research at the intersection of computer science and social science in particular on computer mediated communication and personal information management. He is a Fellow of the Association for Computing Machinery (ACM), and winner of the CSCW 2018 "Lasting Impact" award. He also received a Lifetime Research Achievement Award from SIGCHI, is a Member of the SIGCHI Academy. He is Editor of the journal Human-Computer Interaction.

== Life ==
He was born in Liverpool in the UK, in 1957. As an undergraduate he studied Natural Sciences at Cambridge, obtaining his PhD in Cognitive Psychology at St. Andrews. He spent many years in industry where he worked at Hewlett-Packard Labs, AT&T Labs, and IBM Research Labs. Moving to academia he was Professor of Information Science at University of Sheffield, before relocating to the University of California in 2009.

== Research ==
He publishes in the fields of human-computer interaction and computer-supported cooperative work. His applies social science theory to understand people's interactions with technologies, using these insights to design new human-centric technologies. His early research focused on computer mediated communication, extending psychological theories of conversation to develop new accounts of online interaction. That work led to the design of novel collaboration, messaging and social computing technologies some which have now become standard. He has also researched personal information management. He co-published a book with Ofer Bergman: The Science of Managing Our Digital Stuff which uses cognitive psychology to understand how we organize and access our personal digital information. He was also one of the first to document how email contributes to information overload, proposing technical approaches to address this. More recently his work examined 'digital memory', critiquing Lifelogging approaches and developing new techniques for understanding and reflecting on our pasts.

== Awards ==
- ACM Fellow (2015)
- ACM SIGCHI Lifetime Research Award (2014)
- ACM SIGCHI Academy (2008)
- ACM CSCW Lasting Impact Award (2018)
- Editor, Human Computer Interaction (2013–present)

== Selected bibliography ==
- Whittaker, S. and Sidner, C. (1996). Email overload: exploring personal information management of email. In Proceedings of CHI'96 Conference on Computer Human Interaction, 276–283, NY: ACM Press. https://dl.acm.org/doi/10.1145/238386.238530
- Whittaker, S., and O'Conaill, B. (1997). The role of vision in face-to-face and mediated communication. In In K. Finn, A. Sellen, S. Wilbur (Eds.), Video mediated communication. LEA: NJ. https://psycnet.apa.org/record/1997-08440-001
- Whittaker, S. Terveen, L., Hill, W., and Cherny, L. (1998). The dynamics of mass interaction, In Proceedings of Conference on Computer Supported Cooperative Work, 257–264. NY: ACM Press. https://dl.acm.org/doi/10.1145/289444.289500
- Nardi, B., Whittaker, S., Bradner, E. (2000). Interaction and Outeraction: Instant Messaging in Action. In Proceedings of Conference on Computer Supported Cooperative Work, 79–88. New York: ACM Press. https://dl.acm.org/doi/10.1145/358916.358975
- Whittaker, S., Terveen, L., and Nardi, B. (2000). Let's stop pushing the envelope and start addressing it: a reference task agenda for HCI. Human Computer Interaction, 15, 75-106. https://dl.acm.org/doi/10.1207/S15327051HCI1523_2
- Whittaker, S. (2002). Theories and Methods in Mediated Communication. In Graesser, A., Gernsbacher, M., and Goldman, S. (Ed.) The Handbook of Discourse Processes, 243–286, Erlbaum, NJ. https://psycnet.apa.org/record/2003-02476-006
- Sellen, A., and Whittaker, S. (2010). Lifelogging: What Are We Doing and Why Are We Doing It? Communications of the ACM, Vol. 53, No. 5, 70–77. https://cacm.acm.org/magazines/2010/5/87249-beyond-total-capture/fulltext
- Whittaker. S. (2011). Personal Information Management: From Consumption to Curation In B. Cronin (Ed.) Annual Review of Information Science and Technology, 45, 1-42, Wiley, Medford, NJ. DOI: 10.1002/aris.2011.1440450108. https://doi.org/10.1002/aris.2011.1440450108
- Whittaker, S., Matthews, T., Cerruti, J., Badenes, H., and Tang, J. (2011). Am I wasting my time organizing email?: a study of email refinding. In Proceedings of the 2011 Conference on Human factors in computing systems (CHI '11). ACM, New York, NY, USA, 3449–3458. https://dl.acm.org/doi/10.1145/1978942.1979457
- Bergman, O. and Whittaker, S (2016). The Science of Managing Our Digital Stuff, Cambridge, MIT Press. https://mitpress.mit.edu/books/science-managing-our-digital-stuff
