= Personal data manager =

A personal data manager (PDM) is a portable hardware tool enabling secure storage and easy access to user data. It can also be an application located on a portable smart device or PC, enabling novice end-users to directly define, classify, and manipulate a universe of information objects. Usually PDMs include password management software, web-browser favorites and cryptographic software. Advanced PDM can also store settings for VPN and Terminal Services, address books, and other features. PDM can also store and launch several portable software applications.

== Examples ==
Companies such as Salmon Technologies and their SalmonPDM application have been innovative in creating personalized directory structures to aid/prompt individuals where to store key typical pieces of information, such as legal documents, education/schooling information, medical information, property/vehicle bills, service contracts, and more. The process of creating directory structures that map to individual/family unit types, such as Child, Adult, Couple, Family with Children/Dependents is referred to as Personal Directory Modeling.

The Databox Project is academia-based research into developing "an open-source personal networked device, augmented by cloud-hosted services, that collates, curates, and mediates access to an individual’s personal data by verified and audited third party applications and services."

== See also ==
- FreedomBox example project
- Personal information manager
