= Personal information management =

Tools and systems for managing one's own data

Personal information management (PIM) is the study and implementation of the activities that people perform to acquire or create, store, organize, maintain, retrieve, and use informational items such as documents (paper-based and digital), web pages, and email messages for everyday use to complete tasks (work-related or not) and fulfill a person's various roles (as parent, employee, friend, member of community, etc.); it is information management with intrapersonal scope. Personal knowledge management is by some definitions a subdomain.

One ideal of PIM is that people should always have the right information in the right place, in the right form, and of sufficient completeness and quality to meet their current need. Technologies and tools can help so that people spend less time with time-consuming and error-prone clerical activities of PIM (such as looking for and organising information). But tools and technologies can also overwhelm people with too much information leading to information overload.

A special focus of PIM concerns how people organize and maintain personal information collections, and methods that can help people in doing so. People may manage information in a variety of settings, for a variety of reasons, and with a variety of types of information. For example, a traditional office worker might manage physical documents in a filing cabinet by placing them in hanging folders organized alphabetically by project name. More recently, this office worker might organize digital documents into the virtual folders of a local, computer-based file system or into a cloud-based store using a file hosting service (e.g., Dropbox, Microsoft OneDrive, Google Drive). People manage information in many more private, personal contexts as well. A parent may, for example, collect and organize photographs of their children into a photo album which might be paper-based or digital.

PIM considers not only the methods used to store and organize information, but also is concerned with how people retrieve information from their collections for re-use. For example, the office worker might re-locate a physical document by remembering the name of the project and then finding the appropriate folder by an alphabetical search. On a computer system with a hierarchical file system, a person might need to remember the top-level folder in which a document is located, and then browse through the folder contents to navigate to the desired document. Email systems often support additional methods for re-finding such as fielded search (e.g., search by sender, subject, date). The characteristics of the document types, the data that can be used to describe them (meta-data), and features of the systems used to store and organize them (e.g. fielded search) are all components that may influence how users accomplish personal information management.

== Overview ==
The purview of PIM is broad. A person's perception of and ability to effect change in the world is determined, constrained, and sometimes greatly extended, by an ability to receive, send and otherwise manage information.

=== Senses in which information is personal ===
Research in the field of personal information management has considered six senses in which information can be personal (to "me") and so an object of that person's PIM activities:

1. Owned by "me", e.g., paper documents in a home office, emails on a personal account, files on a personal computer or in the personal store of a Web cloud service. Preservation of this information especially for the longer-term and for legacy raises issues of personal archiving. The increasing digitization of personal information raises issues of digital preservation.
2. About "me". This refers especially to information (sometimes referred to as personal data) kept by others such as credit records, health records, search history, etc. Such information can greatly impact a person's reputation, treatment and ability to get things done and raises major issues of privacy.
3. Directed toward "me", e.g., e-mails, phone calls, drop-ins, TV ads, web ads, pop-ups and including, even, self-interruptions (e.g., interrupting a work task to check a sports score). The management of incoming information raises issues of attention management: It can sometimes have critical importance but at other times, it can distract and derail a person's efforts to get things done. Information filtering systems have the potential to increase the relevance to the person of incoming information but at the potential cost of reinforcing a person's prejudices and preconceived notions or of filtering out information that the person should experience.
4. Sent/Posted by "me", e.g., sent e-mails, personal websites, blog posts, social media posts, published reports and articles. Information provided by a person – deliberately and inadvertently – can prove decisive in the impressions that others form of this person.
5. Experienced by "me", e.g., Web history, photos (taken by others as well as by "me"), journal entries, full-motion videos from head-mounted cameras and other efforts to lifelog. The increasing use of tools that keep a time-stamped record of a person's activities and bodily states either explicitly (e.g., Fitbit or the Apple Watch) or implicitly (e.g., through Web page browsing, emails and texts) has given rise to notions of a quantified self.
6. Relevant to "me"—a catch-all category that includes information of potential relevance to a person e.g., information a person does not know about but ought to know about. Recommender systems, which learn a person's preferences either from explicit ratings or, implicitly, from a person's past selections, have the potential to make a person aware of information the person might not otherwise know about or think to search for. More conventionally, a person's network of friends, family and colleagues can provide a means for the person to incidentally encounter information of relevance.

=== Personal space of information and personal information collections ===
An encyclopaedic review of PIM literature suggests that all six senses of personal information listed above and the tools and technologies used to work with such information (from email applications and word processors to personal information managers and virtual assistants) combine to form a personal space of information (PSI, pronounced as in the Greek letter, alternately referred to as a personal information space) that is unique for each individual. Within a person's PSI are personal information collections (PICs) or, simply, collections. Examples include:

- photos, digital or paper-based, possibly as organized into albums, virtual or physical;
- digital documents organized into folders and subfolders
- emails, organized into email folders or, possibly, left in an ever larger inbox;
- paper documents relating to personal finances and possessions, as organized into the hanging folders of a traditional vertical filing cabinet.
- digital songs as organized through application such as iTunes.

=== Activities ===
Activities of PIM – i.e., the actions people take to manage information that is personal to them in one or more of the ways listed above – can be seen as an effort to establish, use, and maintain a mapping between information and need.

Two activities of PIM occur repeatedly throughout a person's day and are often prompted by external events.

- Activities to find (and re-find) move from a current need toward information to meet this need. If a person is asked by a colleague "When is the staff meeting?", for example, the person may meet the need (to answer accurately) by checking in a calendar of scheduled events.
- Activities to keep move from encountered information toward anticipated need. A person may, for example, receive an email (information encountered) and flag (an act of keeping) as "high priority" or "read later" depending upon the message's assessed importance.

Meta-level activities focus more broadly on aspects of the mapping itself.

- Activities to maintain and organize focus on personal information collections such as a person's inbox, photo collection, or the digital documents in a personal file system. Included are efforts to delete or archive information that is out-of-date or no longer used, efforts to update file formats, and efforts to create backups of information to secure against loss. Also included are efforts to create an organizing structure in support of keeping and re-finding.
- Activities to manage privacy and the flow of information include, for example, decisions concerning privacy settings in a social media application such as Facebook and efforts to manage email subscriptions and efforts to filter incoming email (e.g., by marking some as "junk" or "spam").
- Activities to measure and evaluate include efforts to assess the time effectiveness of a practice of PIM e.g., "Am I spending too much time in email?"; "Is this folder structure worth the trouble it takes to maintain?"
- Activities to make sense of and use information focus on the decisions to make and the actions to take for a collection of information, once gathered. For example, among the choices available in new automobiles (new laptops, new employees, etc.), which will best meet a person's needs? Or what is the overall picture of health that emerges from all the data kept by a fitness tracker?

PIM activities overlap with one another. For example, the effort to keep an email attachment as a document in a personal file system may prompt an activity to organize the file system e.g., by creating a new folder for the document. Similarly, activities to organize may be initiated by a person's efforts to find a document as when, for example, a person discovers that two folders have overlapping content and should be consolidated.

Meta-level activities overlap not only with finding and keeping activities but, even more so, with each other. For example, efforts to reorganize a personal file system can be motivated by the evaluation that the current file organization is too time-consuming to maintain and doesn't properly highlight the information most in need of attention.

=== Information items, forms, and fragmentation ===
Information sent and received takes many different information forms. Paper-based items such as letters are still sent by some people, but increasingly, people communicate using digital forms of information. These include emails, digital documents shared (as attachments or via a file hosting service such as Dropbox), blog posts and social media updates (e.g., using a service such as Facebook), text messages and links, text, photos, and videos shared via services such as Twitter, Snapchat, Reddit, and Instagram.

People work with information items as packages of information with properties that vary depending upon the information form involved. Files, emails, "tweets", Facebook updates, blog posts, etc. are each examples of the information item. The ways in which an information item can be manipulated depend upon its underlying form. Items can be created but not always deleted (completely). Most items can be copied, sent and transformed as in, for example, when a digital photo is taken of a paper document (transforming from paper to digital) and then possibly further transformed as when optical character recognition is used to extract text from the digital photo, and then transformed yet again when this information is sent to others via a text message.

Information fragmentation is a key problem of PIM often made worse by the many information forms a person must work with. Information is scattered widely across information forms on different devices, in different formats, in different organizations, with different supporting tools.

Information fragmentation creates problems for each kind of PIM activity. Where to keep new information? Where to look for (re-find) information already kept? Meta-level activities, such as maintaining and organizing, are also more difficult and time-consuming when different stores on different devices must be separately maintained. Problems of information fragmentation are especially manifest when a person must look across multiple devices and applications to gather together the information needed to complete a project.

== History and background ==
PIM is a new field with ancient roots. When the oral rather than the written word dominated, human memory was the primary means for information preservation. As information was increasingly rendered in paper form, tools were developed over time to meet the growing challenges of management. For example, the vertical filing cabinet, now such a standard feature of home and workplace offices, was first commercially available in 1893.

With the increasing availability of computers in the 1950s came an interest in the computer as a source of metaphors and a test bed for efforts to understand the human ability to process information and to solve problems. Newell and Simon pioneered the computer's use as a tool to model human thought. They produced "The Logic Theorist", generally thought to be the first running artificial intelligence (AI) program. The computer of the 1950s was also an inspiration for the development of an information processing approach to human behavior and performance.

After the 1950s research showed that the computer, as a symbol processor, could "think" (to varying degrees of fidelity) like people do, the 1960s saw an increasing interest in the use of the computer to help people to think better and to process information more effectively. Working with Andries van Dam and others, Ted Nelson, who coined the word "hypertext", developed one of the first hypertext systems, The Hypertext Editing System, in 1968. That same year, Douglas Engelbart also completed work on a hypertext system called NLS (oN-Line System). Engelbart advanced the notion that the computer could be used to augment the human intellect. As heralded by the publication of Ulric Neisser's book Cognitive Psychology, the 1960s also saw the emergence of cognitive psychology as a discipline that focused primarily on a better understanding of the human ability to think, learn, and remember.

The computer as aid to the individual, rather than remote number cruncher in a refrigerated room, gained further validity from work in the late 1970s and through the 1980s to produce personal computers of increasing power and portability. These trends continue: computational power roughly equivalent to that of a desktop computer of a decade ago can now be found in devices that fit into the palm of a hand. The phrase "Personal Information Management" was itself apparently first used in the 1980s in the midst of general excitement over the potential of the personal computer to greatly enhance the human ability to process and manage information. The 1980s also saw the advent of so-called "PIM tools" that provided limited support for the management of such things as appointments and scheduling, to-do lists, phone numbers, and addresses. A community dedicated to the study and improvement of human–computer interaction also emerged in the 1980s.

Prior to the introduction of the term "Personal digital assistant" ("PDA") by Apple in 1992, handheld personal organizers such as the Psion Organiser and the Sharp Wizard were also referred to as "PIMs". The time management and communications functions of PIMs largely migrated from PDAs to smartphones, with Apple, RIM (Research In Motion, now BlackBerry), and others all manufacturing smartphones that offer most of the functions of earlier PDAs.

As befits the "information" focus of PIM, PIM-relevant research of the 1980s and 1990s extended beyond the study of a particular device or application towards larger ecosystems of information management to include, for example, the organization of the physical office and the management of paperwork. Malone characterized personal organization strategies as 'neat' or 'messy' and described 'filing' and 'piling' approaches to the organization of information. Other studies showed that people vary their methods for keeping information according to anticipated uses of that information in the future. Studies explored the practical implications that human memory research might carry in the design of, for example, personal filing systems, and information retrieval systems. Studies demonstrated a preference for navigation (browsing, "location-based finding) in the return to personal files, a preference that endures today notwithstanding significant improvements in search support. and an increasing use of search as the preferred method of return to e-mails.

PIM, as a contemporary field of inquiry with a self-identified community of researchers, traces its origins to a Special Interest Group (SIG) session on PIM at the CHI 2004 conference and to a special National Science Foundation (NSF)-sponsored workshop held in Seattle in 2005.

== Research ==
Much PIM research can be grouped according to the PIM activity that is the primary focus of the research. These activities are reflected in the two main models of PIM, i.e., that primary PIM activities are finding/re-finding, keeping and meta-level activities (see section Activities of PIM) or, alternatively, keeping, managing, and exploiting. Important research is also being done under the special topics: Personality, mood, and emotion both as impacting and impacted by a person's practice of PIM, the management of personal health information and the management of personal information over the long run and for legacy.

=== Finding/re-finding ===
In personal information management, finding refers to locating information needed for a current task, while re-finding refers to locating information that has been previously encountered.

Throughout a typical day, people repeatedly experience the need for information in large amounts and small (e.g., "When is my next meeting?"; "What's the status of the budget forecast?" "What's in the news today?") prompting activities to find and re-find.

A large body of research in information seeking, information behavior, and information retrieval relates and especially to efforts to find information in public spaces such as the Web or a traditional library. There is a strong personal component even in efforts to find new information, never before experienced, from a public store such as the Web. For example, efforts to find information may be directed by a personally created outline, self-addressed email reminder or a to-do list. In addition, information inside a person's PSI can be used to support a more targeted, personalized search of the web.

Research in information seeking, information behavior, and information retrieval has treated re-finding as a common activity, especially in relation to web pages, email messages, and personal digital files.

A person's efforts to find useful information are often a sequence of interactions rather than a single transaction. Under a "berry picking" model of finding, information is gathered in bits and pieces through a series of interactions, and during this time, a person's expression of need, as reflected in the current query, evolves. People may favor stepwise approach to finding needed information to preserve a greater sense of control and context over the finding process and smaller steps may also reduce the cognitive burden associated with query formulation. In some cases, there simply is not a "direct" way to access the information. For example, a person's remembrance for a needed Web site may only be through an email message sent by a colleague i.e., a person may not recall a Web address nor even keywords that might get be used in a Web search but the person does recall that the Web site was mentioned recently in an email from a colleague).

Studies of re-finding emphasize that people often rely on partial contextual cues rather than exact recall. These cues may include where an item was stored, how it was previously reached, who sent it, or the task in which it was used. Re-finding can also be affected by changes in the information environment, including the reorganization, updating, or disappearance of online resources.

People may find (rather than re-find) information even when this information is ostensibly under their control. For example, items may be "pushed" into the PSI (e.g., via the inbox, podcast subscriptions, downloads). If these items are discovered later, it is through an act of finding not re-finding (since the person has no remembrance for the information).

Lansdale characterized the retrieval of information as a two-step process involving interplay between actions to recall and recognize. The steps of recall and recognition can iterate to progressively narrow the efforts to find the desired information. This interplay happens, for example, when people move through a folder hierarchy to a desired file or e-mail message or navigate through a website to a desired page.

But re-finding begins first with another step: Remember to look in the first place. People may take the trouble to create Web bookmarks or to file away documents and then forget about this information so that, in worst case, the original effort is wasted.

Also, finding/re-finding often means not just assembling a single item of information but rather a set of information. The person may need to repeat the finding sequence several times. A challenge in tool support is to provide people with ways to group or interrelate information items so that their chances improve of retrieving a complete set of the information needed to complete a task.

Over the years, PIM studies have determined that people prefer to return to personal information, most notably the information kept in personal digital files, by navigating rather than searching.

Support for searching personal information has improved dramatically over the years most notably in the provision for full-text indexing to improve search speed. With these improvements, preference may be shifting to search as a primary means for locating email messages (e.g., search on subject or sender, for messages not in view).

However, a preference persists for navigation as the primary means of re-finding personal files (e.g., stepwise folder traversal; scanning a list of files within a folder for the desired file), notwithstanding ongoing improvements in search support. The enduring preference for navigation as a primary means of return to files may have a neurological basis i.e., navigation to files appears to use mental facilities similar to those people use to navigate in the physical world.

Preference for navigation is also in line with a primacy effect repeatedly observed in psychological research such that preferred method of return aligns with initial exposure. Under a first impressions hypothesis, if a person's initial experience with a file included its placement in a folder, where the folder itself was reached by navigating through a hierarchy of containing folders, then the person will prefer a similar method – navigation – for return to the file later.

There have been some prototyping efforts to explore an in-context creation e.g., creation in the context of a project the person is working on, of not only files, but also other forms of information such as web references and email. Prototyping efforts have also explored ways to improve support for navigation e.g., by highlighting and otherwise making it easier to follow, the paths people are more likely to take in their navigation back to a file.

=== Keeping ===
Many events of daily life are roughly the converse of finding events: People encounter information and try to determine what, if anything, they should do with this information, i.e., people must match the information encountered to current or anticipated needs. Decisions and actions relating to encountered information are collectively referred to as keeping activities.

The ability to effectively handle information that is encountered by happenstance is essential to a person's ability to discover new material and make new connections. People also keep information that they have actively sought but do not have time to process currently. A search on the web, for example, often produces much more information than can be consumed in the current session. Both the decision to keep this information for later use and the steps to do so are keeping activities.

Keeping activities are also triggered when people are interrupted during a current task and look for ways of preserving the current state so that work can be quickly resumed later. People keep appointments by entering reminders into a calendar and keep good ideas or "things to pick up at the grocery store" by writing down a few cryptic lines on a loose piece of paper. People keep not only to ensure they have the information later, but also to build reminders to look for and use this information. Failure to remember to use information later is one kind of prospective memory failure. In order to avoid such a failure, people may, for example, self-e-mail a web page reference in addition to or instead of making a bookmark because the e-mail message with the reference appears in the inbox where it is more likely to be noticed and used.

The keeping decision can be characterized as a signal detection task subject to errors of two kinds: 1) an incorrect rejection ("miss") when information is ignored that later is needed and should have been kept (e.g., proof of charitable donations needed now to file a tax return) and 2) a false positive when information kept as useful (incorrectly judged as "signal") turns out not to be used later. Information kept and never used only adds to the clutter – digital and physical – in a person's life.

Keeping can be a difficult and error prone effort. Filing i.e., placing information items such as paper documents, digital documents and emails, into folders, can be especially so. To avoid, or delay filing information (e.g., until more is known concerning where the information might be used), people may opt to put information in "piles" instead. (Digital counterparts to physical piling include leaving information in the email inbox or placing digital documents and web links into a holding folder such as "stuff to look at later".) But information kept in a pile, physical or virtual, is easily forgotten as the pile fades into a background of clutter and research indicates that a typical person's ability to keep track of different piles, by location alone, is limited.

Tagging provides another alternative to filing information items into folders. A strict folder hierarchy does not readily allow for the flexible classification of information even though, in a person's mind, an information item might fit in several different categories. A number of tag-related prototypes for PIM have been developed over the years. A tagging approach has also been pursued in commercial systems, most notably Gmail (as "labels"), but the success of tags so far is mixed. Bergman et al. found that users, when provided with options to use folders or tags, preferred folders to tags and, even when using tags, they typically refrained from adding more than a single tag per information item. Civan et al., through an engagement of participants in critical, comparative observation of both tagging and the use of folders were able to elicit some limitations of tagging not previously discussed openly such as, for example, that once a person decides to use multiple tags, it is usually important to continue doing so (else the tag not applied consistently becomes ineffective as a means of retrieving a complete set of items).

Technologies may help to reduce the costs, in personal time and effort, of keeping and the likelihood of error. For example, the ability to take a digital photo of a sign, billboard announcement or the page of a paper document can obviate the task of otherwise transcribing (or photocopying) the information.

A person's ongoing use of a smartphone through the day can create a time-stamped record of events as a kind of automated keeping and especially of information "experienced by me" (see section, "The senses in which information is personal") with potential use in a person's efforts to journal or to return to information previously experienced ("I think I read the email while in the taxi on the way to the airport..."). Activity tracking technology can further enrich the record of a person's daily activity with potential use for people to enrich their understanding of their daily lives and the healthiness of their diet and their activities.

Technologies to automate the keeping of personal information segue to personal informatics and the quantified self movement, life logging, in the extreme, a 'total capture" of information. Tracking technologies raise serious issues of privacy (see "Managing privacy and the flow of information"). Additional questions arise concerning the utility and even the practical accessibility of "total capture".

=== Maintaining and organizing ===
Activities of finding and, especially, keeping can segue into activities to maintain and organize as when, for example, efforts to keep a document in the file system prompt the creation of a new folder or efforts to re-find a document highlight the need to consolidate two folders with overlapping content and purpose.

Differences between people are especially apparent in their approaches to the maintenance and organization of information. Malone distinguished between "neat" and "messy" organizations of paper documents. "Messy" people had more piles in their offices and appeared to invest less effort than "neat" people in filing information. Comparable differences have been observed in the ways people organize digital documents, emails, and web references.

Activities of keeping correlate with activities of organizing so that, for example, people with more elaborate folder structures tend to file information more often and sooner. However, people may be selective in the information forms for which they invest efforts to organize. The schoolteachers who participated in one study, for example, reported having regular "spring cleaning" habits for organization and maintenance of paper documents but no comparable habits for digital information.

Activities of organization (e.g., creating and naming folders) segue into activities of maintenance such as consolidating redundant folders, archiving information no longer in active use, and ensuring that information is properly backed up and otherwise secured. (See also section, "Managing privacy and the flow of information").

Studies of people's folder organizations for digital information indicate that these have uses going far beyond the organization of files for later retrieval. Folders are information in their own right – representing, for example, a person's evolving understanding of a project and its components. A folder hierarchy can sometimes represent an informal problem decomposition with a parent folder representing a project and subfolders representing major components of the project (e.g., "wedding reception" and "church service" for a "wedding" project).

However, people generally struggle to keep their information organized and often do not have reliable backup routines. People have trouble maintaining and organizing many distinct forms of information (e.g., digital documents, emails, and web references) and are sometimes observed to make special efforts to consolidate different information forms into a single organization.

With increasing stores of personal digital information, people face challenges of digital curation. At the same time, these stores offer their owners the opportunity for exploitation of their information in new ways.

Empirical observations of PIM studies motivate prototyping efforts towards information tools to provide better support for the maintenance, organization and, going further, curation of personal information. For example, GrayArea applies the demotion principle of the user-subjective approach to allow people to move less frequently used files in any given folder to a gray area at the bottom end of the listing of this folder. These files can still be accessed but are less visible and so less distracting of a person's attention.

The Planz prototype supports an in-context creation and integration of project-related files, emails, web references, informal notes and other forms of information into a simplified, document-like interface meant to represent the project with headings corresponding to folders in the personal file system and subheadings (for tasks, sub-projects, or other project components) corresponding to subfolders. The intention is that a single, useful organization should emerge incidentally as people focus on the planning and completion of their projects.

=== Managing privacy and the flow of information ===
People face a continual evaluation of tradeoffs in deciding what information "flows" into and out of their PSI. Each interaction poses some degree of risk to privacy and security. Letting out information to the wrong recipients can lead to identity theft. Letting in the wrong kind of information can mean that a person's devices are "infected" and the person's data is corrupted or "locked" for ransom. By some estimates, 30% or more of the computers in the United States are infected. However, the exchange of information, incoming and outgoing, is an essential part of living in the modern world. To order goods and services online, people must be prepared to "let out" their credit card information. To try out a potentially useful, new information tool, people may need to "let in" a download that could potentially make unwelcome changes to the web browser or the desktop. Providing for adequate control over the information, coming into and out of a PSI, is a major challenge. Even more challenging is the user interface to make clear the implications for various privacy choices particularly regarding Internet privacy. What, for example, are the personal information privacy implications of clicking the "Sign Up" button for use of social media services such as Facebook.

=== Measuring and evaluating ===
People seek to understand how they might improve various aspects of their PIM practices with questions such as "Do I really need to keep all this information?"; "Is this tool (application, applet, device) worth the troubles (time, frustration) of its use?" and, perhaps most persistent, "Where did the day go? Where has the time gone? What did I accomplish?". These last questions may often be voiced in reflection, perhaps on the commute home from work at the end of the workday. But there is increasing reason to expect that answers will be based on more than remembrance and reflection. Increasingly data incidentally, automatically captured over the course of a person's day and the person's interactions with various information tools to work with various forms of information (files, emails, texts, pictures, etc.) can be brought to bear in evaluations of a person's PIM practice and the identification of possible ways to improve.

=== Making sense of and using information ===
Efforts to make sense of information represent another set of meta-level activity that operate on personal information and the mapping between information and need. People must often assemble and analyze a larger collection of information to decide what to do next. "Which job applicant is most likely to work best for us?", "Which retirement plan to choose?", "What should we pack for our trip?". These and many other decisions are generally based not on a single information item but on a collection of information items – documents, emails (e.g., with advice or impressions from friends and colleagues), web references, etc. Making sense of information is "meta" not only for its broader focus on information collections but also because it permeates most PIM activity even when the primary purpose may ostensibly be something else. For example, as people organize information into folders, ostensibly to ensure its subsequent retrieval, people may also be making sense and coming to a deeper understanding of this information.

=== Personality, mood, and emotion ===
Personality and mood can impact a person's practice of PIM and, in turn, a person's emotions can be impacted by the person's practice of PIM.

In particular, personality traits (e.g., "conscientiousness" or "neuroticism") have, in certain circumstances, been shown to correlate with the extent to which a person keeps and organizes information into a personal archive such as a personal filing system. However, another recent study found personality traits were not correlated with any aspects of personal filing systems, suggesting that PIM practices are influenced less by personality than by external factors such as the operating system used (i.e. Mac OS or Windows), which were seen to be much more predictive.

Aside from the correlation between practices of PIM and more enduring personality traits, there is evidence to indicate that a person's (more changeable) mood impacts activities of PIM so that, for example, a person experiencing negative moods, when organizing personal information, is more likely to create a structure with more folders where folders, on average, contain fewer files.

Conversely, the information a person keeps or routinely encounters (e.g., via social media), can profoundly impact a person's mood. Even as explorations continue into the potential for the automatic, incidental capture of information (see section Keeping) there is growing awareness for the need to design for forgetting as well as for remembrance as, for example, when a person realizes the need to dispose of digital belongings in the aftermath of a romantic breakup or the death of a loved one.

Beyond the negative feelings induced by information associated with a failed relationship, people experience negative feelings about their PIM practices, per se. People are shown in general to experience anxiety and dissatisfaction with respect to their personal information archives including both concerns of possible loss of the information and also express concerns about their ability and effectiveness in managing and organizing their information.

=== Management of personal health information ===
Traditional, personal health information resides in various information systems in healthcare institutions (e.g., clinics, hospitals, insurance providers), often in the form of medical records. People often have difficulty managing or even navigating a variety of paper or electronic medical records across multiple health services in different specializations and institutions. Also referred to as personal health records, this type of personal health information usually requires people (i.e., patients) to engage in additional PIM finding activities to locate and gain access to health information and then to generate a comprehensible summary for their own use.

With the rise of consumer-facing health products including activity trackers and health-related mobile apps, people are able to access new types of personal health data (e.g., physical activity, heart rate) outside healthcare institutions. PIM behavior also changes. Much of the effort to keep information is automated. But people may experience difficulties making sense of a using the information later, e.g., to plan future physical activities based on activity tracker data. People are also frequently engaged in other meta-level activities, such as maintaining and organizing (e.g., syncing data across different health-related mobile apps).

== Methods and methodologies of PIM study and tool design ==
The purpose of PIM study is both descriptive and prescriptive. PIM research seeks to understand what people do now and the problems they encounter i.e., in the management of information and the use of information tools. This understanding is useful on its own but should also have application to understand what might be done in techniques, training and, especially, tool design to improve a person's practice of PIM.

The nature of PIM makes its study challenging. The techniques and preferred methods of a person's PIM practice can vary considerably with information form (e.g., files vs. emails) and over time. The operating system and the default file manager are also shown to impact PIM practices especially in the management of files. A person's practice is also observed to vary in significant ways with gender, age and current life circumstances. Certainly, differences among people on different sides of the so-called "digital divide" will have profound impact on PIM practices. And, as noted in section "Personality, mood, and emotion", personality traits and even a person's current mood can impact PIM behavior.

For research results to generalize, or else to be properly qualified, PIM research, at least in aggregate, should include the study of people, with a diversity of backgrounds and needs, over time as they work in many different situations, with different forms of information and different tools of information management.

At the same time, PIM research, at least in initial exploratory phases, must often be done in situ (e.g., in a person's workplace or office or at least where people have access to their laptops, smartphones and other devices of information management) so that people can be observed as they manage information that is "personal" to them (see section "The senses in which information is personal"). Exploratory methods are demanding in the time of both observer and participant and can also be intrusive for the participants. Consequently, the number and nature of participants is likely to be limited i.e., participants may often be people "close at hand" to the observer as family, friends, colleagues or other members of the observer's community.

For example, the guided tour, in which the participant is asked to give an interviewer a "tour" of the participant's various information collections (e.g., files, emails, Web bookmarks, digital photographs, paper documents, etc.), has proven a very useful, but expensive method of study with results bound by caveats reflecting the typically small number and narrow sampling of participants.

The guided tour method is one of several methods that are excellent for exploratory work but expensive and impractical to do with a larger, more diverse sampling of people. Other exploratory methods include the use of think aloud protocols collected, for example, as a participant completes a keeping or finding task, and the experience sampling method wherein participants report on their PIM actions and experiences over time possibly as prompted (e.g., by a beep or a text on a smartphone).

A challenge is to combine, within or across studies, time-consuming (and often demographically biased) methods of exploratory observation with other methods that have broader, more economical reach. The exploratory methods bring out interesting patterns; the follow-on methods add in numbers and diversity of participants. Among these methods are:

- Surveys that can potentially reach a large and diverse audience.
- The automated gathering of data on collections in a PSI e.g., for a personal file system to measure number of folders, depth, and average number of files per folder.
- The increasing use of activity tracking technology and the nearly round-the-clock use of smartphones creates new opportunities to gather PIM-relevant data with minimal time and trouble (but, of course, with participant permission).

Another method using the Delphi technique for achieving consensus has been used to leverage the expertise and experience of PIM researchers as means of extending, indirectly, the number and diversity of PIM practices represented.

The purview of PIM tool design applies to virtually any tool people use to work with their information including "sticky notes" and hanging folders for paper-based information to a wide range of computer-based applications for the management of digital information, ranging from applications people use every day such as Web browsers, email applications and texting applications to personal information managers.

With respect to methods for the evaluation of alternatives in PIM tools design, PIM researchers again face an "in situ" challenge. How to evaluate an alternative, as nearly as possible, in the working context of a person's PSI? One "let it lie" approach would provide for interfaces between the tool under evaluation and a participant's PSI so that the tool can work with a participant's other tools and the participant's personal information (as opposed to working in a separate environment with "test" data). Dropbox and other file hosting services exemplify this approach: Users can continue to work with their files and folders locally on their computers through the file manager even as an installed applet works to seamlessly synchronize the users files and folders with a Web store for the added benefits of a backup and options to synchronize this information with other devices and share this information with other users.

As what is better described as a methodology of tool design rather than a method, Bergman reports good success in the application of a user-subjective approach. The user-subjective approach advances three design principles. In brief, the design should allow the following: 1) all project-related items no matter their form (or format) are to be organized together (the subjective project classification principle); 2) the importance of information (to the user) should determine its visual salience and accessibility (the subjective importance principle); and 3) information should be retrieved and used by the user in the same context as it was previously used in (the subjective context principle). The approach may suggest design principles that serve not only in evaluating and improving existing systems but also in creating new implementations. For example, according to the demotion principle, information items of lower subjective importance should be demoted (i.e., by making them less visible) so as not to distract the user but be kept within their original context just in case they are needed. The principle has been applied in the creation of several interesting prototypes.

Finally, a simple "checklist" methodology of tool design", follows from an assessment of a proposed tool design with respect to each of the six senses in which information can be personal (see section "The senses in which information is personal") and each of the six activities of PIM (finding, keeping and the four meta-level activities, see section "Activities of PIM"). A tool that is good with respect to one kind of personal information or one PIM activity, may be bad with respect to another. For example, a new smartphone app that promises to deliver information potentially "relevant to me" (the "6th sense" in which information is personal) may do so only at the cost of a distracting increase in the information "directed to me" and by keeping too much personal information "about me" in a place not under the person's control.

== Tools ==
A personal information manager (often referred to as a PIM tool or, more simply, a PIM) is a type of application software that functions as a personal organizer. The acronym PIM is now, more commonly, used in reference to personal information management as a field of study. As an information management tool, a PIM tool's purpose is to facilitate the recording, tracking, and management of certain types of "personal information".

Some PIM/PDM software products are capable of synchronizing data over a computer network, including mobile ad hoc networks (MANETs). This feature typically stores the personal data on cloud drives allowing for continuous concurrent data updates/access, on the user's computers, including desktop computers, laptop computers, and mobile devices, such a personal digital assistants or smartphones.)

=== Scope ===
Personal information can include any of the following:

- Accounts and accounts data
- Address books
- Alerts
- Bookmarks
- A digital calendar with calendar dates, such as:
  - Anniversaries
  - Appointments
  - Birthdays
  - Events
  - Meetings
- Education records
- Email
- Fax communications
- Itineraries
- Instant message archives
- Legal documents
- Lists (such as reading lists, task lists)
- Medical information, such as healthcare provider contact information, medical history, prescriptions
- Passwords and login credentials
- Personal file collections (digital and physical): documents, music, photos, videos and similar
- Personal diary/journal/memos/notes
- Project management features
- Recipes
- Reference materials (including scientific references, websites of interest)
- RSS/Atom feeds
- Reminders
- Settings
- Voicemail communications

== Related activities and areas ==
PIM is a practical meeting ground for many disciplines including cognitive psychology, cognitive science, human-computer interaction (HCI), human information interaction (HII), library and information science (LIS), artificial intelligence (AI), information retrieval, information behavior, organizational information management, and information science.

=== Cognitive psychology and cognitive science ===
Cognitive psychology, as the study of how people learn and remember, problem solve, and make decisions, necessarily also includes the study of how people make smart use of available information. The related field of cognitive science, in its efforts to apply these questions more broadly to the study and simulation of intelligent behavior, is also related to PIM. (Cognitive science, in turn, has significant overlap with the field of artificial intelligence).

There is great potential for a mutually beneficial interplay between cognitive science and PIM. Sub-areas of cognitive science of clear relevance to PIM include problem solving and decision making. For example, folders created to hold information for a big project such as "plan my wedding" may sometimes resemble a problem-decomposition. To take another example, the signal detection task has long been used to frame and explain human behavior and has recently been used as a basis for analyzing our choices concerning what information to keep and how – a key activity of PIM. Similarly, there is interplay between the psychological study of categorization and concept formation and the PIM study of how people use tags and folders to describe and organize their information.

As people do PIM they work in an external environment that includes other people, available technology, and, often, an organizational setting. This means that situated cognition, distributed cognition, and social cognition all relate to the study of PIM.

=== Human–computer and human–information interaction ===
The study of PIM is also related to the field of human–computer interaction (HCI). Some of the more influential papers on PIM over the years have been published in HCI journals and conference proceedings. However, the "I" in PIM is for information – in various forms, paper-based and digital (e.g., books, digital documents, emails and, even, the letter magnets on a refrigerator in the kitchen). The "I" in HCI stands for "interaction" as this relates to the "C" – computers. (An argument has been advanced that HCI should be focused more on information rather than computers.)

=== Group information management ===
Group information management (GIM, usually pronounced with a soft "G") has been written about elsewhere in the context of PIM. The study of GIM, in turn, has clear relevance to the study of computer-supported cooperative work (CSCW). GIM is to CSCW as PIM is to HCI. Just as concerns of PIM substantially overlap with but are not fully subsumed by concerns of HCI (nor vice versa), concerns of GIM overlap with but are not subsumed by concerns of CSCW. Information in support of GIM activities can be in non-digital forms such as paper calendars and bulletin boards that do not involve computers.

Group and social considerations frequently enter into a person's PIM strategy. For example, one member of a household may agree to manage medical information for everyone in the household (e.g., shot records) while another member of the household manages financial information for the household. But the collaborative organization and sharing of information is often difficult because, for example, the people working together in a group may have many different perspectives on how best to organize information.

In larger organizational settings, the GIM goals of the organization may conflict with the PIM goals of individuals working within the organization, where the goals of different individuals may also conflict. Individuals may, for example, keep copies of secure documents on their private laptops for the sake of convenience even though doing so violates group (organizational) security. Given drawbacks—real or perceived—in the use of web services that support a shared use of folders, people working in a group may opt to share information instead through the use of e-mail attachments.

=== Data, information, and knowledge management ===
Concerns of data management relate to PIM especially with respect to the safe, secure, long-term preservation of personal information in digital form. The study of information management and knowledge management in organizations also relates to the study of PIM and issues seen first at an organizational level often migrate to the PIM domain.

Concerns of knowledge management on a personal (vs. organizational) level have given rise to arguments for a field of personal knowledge management (PKM). However, knowledge is not a "thing" to be managed directly but rather indirectly e.g., through items of information such as Web pages, emails and paper documents. PKM is best regarded as a useful subset of PIM with special focus on important issues that might otherwise be overlooked such as self-directed efforts of knowledge elicitation ("What do I know? What have I learned?") and knowledge instillation ("how better to learn what it is I want to know?")

=== Time and task management ===
Both time management and task management on a personal level make heavy use of information tools and external forms of information such as to-do lists, calendars, timelines, and email exchange. These are another form of information to be managed. Over the years, email, in particular, has been used in an ad hoc manner in support of task management.

=== Personal network management ===
Much of the useful information a person receives comes, often unprompted, through a person's network of family, friends and colleagues. People reciprocate and much of the information a person sends to others reflects an attempt to build relationships and influence the behavior of others. As such, personal network management (PNM) is a crucial aspect of PIM and can be understood as the practice of managing the links and connections to other people for social and professional benefits.

=== User-centered browser logging tools for research ===
Research on personal information management and information retrieval has also used browser logging tools to collect user-contributed data about web search and browsing behavior. Systems developed for this purpose have included the Lemur Query Log Toolbar, CrowdLogger, HCI Browser, and IRIS. Related work has also explored personal web archiving systems such as WASP, which sought to preserve pages for later search and revisitation, although reproducing archived web pages has remained technically difficult.

== See also ==
- Comparison of note-taking software
- Desktop wiki
- Personal data manager
- Personal organizer
- Personal wiki
- Personal information manager
- List of personal information managers
- Semantic desktop
