= Hazel (given name) =

Female given name

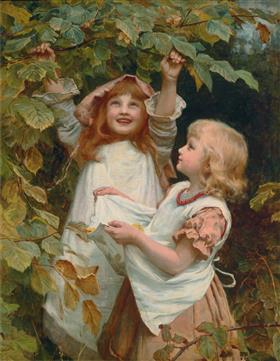
- "Nutting" by Frederick Morgan.
- Gender: Primarily feminine

Origin
- Origin: English
- Meaning: "hazel"

Hazel is a primarily female given name meaning "hazel", from the name of the tree or the color. It is derived from the Old English hæsel. It became a popular name in English-speaking countries during the 19th century, along with other names of plants or trees used for girls.

Until about 1865, Hazel was a rare name that was primarily in masculine use in the United States. A sympathetic character in the 1880 play Hazel Kirke by Steele MacKaye helped popularize it as a feminine name in the late 1800s. It later fell out of fashion but has increased in popularity due to the influence of the character Hazel Grace Lancaster in the 2012 novel The Fault in Our Stars by John Green and its 2014 film adaptation.

The name was among the 25 most popular names for girls in the United States at the turn of the 20th century. It declined in usage in that country after the 1960s but rose again in usage after 1998. It has ranked among the top 50 names for newborn girls in the United States since 2017. It also was occasionally used for boys in the United States between 1900 and 1940.

The name has also increased in popularity in recent years for girls in other English-speaking countries such as Ireland and Canada, where it was the 38th most popular name given to newborn girls in 2021 and 2022.

Variations include Hazell, Hazelle, Hasel, and Heizle. Other names in use such as Hazelee, Hazeleigh, Hazelyn, and Hazelynn might be variants.

== People ==
- Hazel Adair (novelist) (real name H. I. Addis; 1900–1990), British novelist
- Hazel Adair (screenwriter) (1920–2015), English actress and screenwriter
- Hazel Larsen Archer (1921–2001), American photographer
- Hazel Ascot (born 1928), English child actress
- Hazel Ong'ayo Ayanga (born 1952), Kenyan theologian
- Hazel Bishop (1906–1998), American chemist and founder of a cosmetics company
- Hazel Blears (born 1956), British politician
- Hazel Brooks (1924–2002), American actress
- Hazel Brown (1942–2022), Trinbagonian women's and consumer rights activist
- Hazel Brugger (born 1993), American-Swiss author, comedian, artist, and television presenter
- Hazel Byford (born 1941), British politician
- Hazel Carby (born 1948), American academic
- Hazel Carter (linguist) (1999–2019), British-American linguist
- Hazel Carter (writer) (1894–1918), American farmer who disguised herself as a soldier
- Hazel Chu (born 1980), Irish politician
- Hazel Court (1926–2008), British actress
- Hazel Crowney, British Bollywood actress
- Hazel Dawn (1890–1988), American actress
- Hazel de Berg (1913–1984), Australian oral historian and broadcaster
- Hazel Dickens (1925–2011), American bluegrass singer
- Hazel Douglas (1923–2016), English actress
- Hazel Doupe (born 2001), Irish actress
- Hazel Nell Dukes (1932–2025), American activist
- Hazel Findlay (born 1989), British climber and mountaineer
- Hazel Garland (1913–1988), American journalist, columnist and newspaper editor
- Hazel Gaudet-Erskine (1908–1975), American social and communications scientist
- Hazel Gaynor (born 1971), English-Irish author
- Hazel Greene (born 1960), Irish archer, power lifter and fencer
- Hazel Hunkins Hallinan (1890–1982), American women's rights activist and journalist
- Hazel Hannell (1895–2002), American artist and activist
- Hazel Hawke (1929–2013), Australian first wife of Bob Hawke
- Hazel Hayes (born 1985), Irish YouTuber, filmmaker, and author
- Hazel Henderson (1933–2022), American activist and writer
- Hazel Homer-Wambeam, American beauty pageant winner
- Hazel Hutchins, Canadian children's author
- Hazel Irvine (born 1965), British television presenter
- Hazel Brill Jackson (1894–1991), American sculptor
- Hazel M. Johnson (1935–2011), American environmental activist
- Hazel Keech (born 1987), British-Mauritian actress and model
- Hazel Kyrk (1886–1957), American economist
- Hazel Lavery (1890–1935), American painter
- Hazel Ying Lee (1912–1944), American aviator
- Hazel Mae (born 1970), Filipino-Canadian sportscaster
- Hazel Massery (born 1942), American anti-integration activist
- Hazel McCallion (1921–2023), Canadian politician
- Hazel Guggenheim McKinley (1903–1995), American painter and art collector
- Hazel Miner (1904–1920), American killed in a blizzard
- Hazel Monteith (1917–2012), Afro-Jamaican advocate, radio personality and social worker
- Hazel E. Munsell (1891–1989), American chemist and educator
- Hazel Newlevant, American cartoonist and editor
- Hazel O'Connor (born 1954), British singer-songwriter and actress
- Hazel R. O'Leary (born 1937), American government official and university administrator
- Hazel Perfect (1927–2015), British mathematician
- Hazel Pete (1914–2003), Chehalis basket weaver
- Hazel Poa (born 1970), Singaporean politician
- Hazel Prior, English Celtic harpist and author
- Hazel Jane Raines (1916–1956), American aviator
- Hazel Redick-Smith (1926–1996), South African tennis player
- Hazel Salmi (1893–1986), American visual artist, arts administrator
- Hazel Scott (1920–1981), American jazz and classical pianist and singer
- Hazel Schmoll (1890–1990), American botanist
- Hazel Sewell (1898–1975), American animator
- Hazel Shermet (1920–2016), American actress, comedian, and singer
- Hazel Sive, South African biologist and educator
- Hazel Brannon Smith (1914–1994), American journalist and publisher
- Hazel Mountain Walker (1889–1980), one of the first African-American women to pass the Ohio bar
- Hazel Wood Waterman (1865–1948), American architect
- Hazel Hitson Weidman (1923–2024), American anthropologist
- Hazel Hotchkiss Wightman (1886–1974), American tennis player
- Hazel Wong, Hong Kong-born Emirati architect

== Fictional characters ==
- Hazel Aden, in the Canadian television drama Degrassi: The Next Generation
- Hazel Bellamy, in Upstairs, Downstairs
- Hazel (Burke), maid to the Baxter family in the comic strip Hazel and the television sitcom based on it
- Hazel Grace Lancaster, in John Green's novel The Fault in Our Stars
- Hazel Levesque, a daughter of Pluto and one of the seven in Rick Riordan's Heroes of Olympus
- Hazel Stone (Heinlein), created by Robert A. Heinlein
- Hazel Woolley, a character in the radio soap opera The Archers
- Hazel, rabbit leader in the Richard Adams novel Watership Down
- Hazel, the narrator of Brian Vaughan's comic book Saga and the first hybrid child to survive infancy
