= Use of social network websites in investigations =

Social network services are increasingly being used in legal and criminal investigations. Information posted on sites such as Twitter, Instagram, and Facebook has been used by police and university officials to prosecute users of said sites. In some situations, content posted on Myspace has been used in court to determine an appropriate sentence based on a defendant's attitude.

The U.S. DOT National Highway Traffic Safety Administration (NHTSA) has made federal grants available to states to train law enforcement officers to use social media sites to identify events that may result in impaired driving or consumption by minors. As of 2012, Michigan spent over $4.5 million through this program, and has trained over 100 local police officers to use social media sites to identify and target events. In more recent years, a majority of police departments have some sort of social media-based strategy in place.

Social media can be used as an investigative tool to obtain probable cause for a search warrant. Agencies can surveil social media sites via software programs, such as X1 Social Discovery, MediaSonar, and Geofeedia.

== How police use social media ==
In 2015 the international Association of Chiefs of Police reported that about 94% of police agencies have some form of Facebook related strategy in place. Among other things, this includes using Facebook to encourage a more positive perception of the police and monitor public gatherings. Social media is considered public space, therefore anything posted is considered public, unless you set your privacy settings to private, and don't accidentally accept friend requests from undercover police. This means that if you post something on Facebook or twitter, police have access to it and have the right to use and monitor it. Police may use tactics such as "Ghosting" where they create undercover profiles and friend requesting suspects in order to keep a closer eye on the daily lives of those suspects. This helps them know when large gatherings are going to occur and possibly increase police presence in that area to ensure public safety. these tactics provide police with otherwise unavailable information on key suspects and people of interest while taking up less time, money and resources. In 2020, when asked police mentioned Facebook (And Facebook live), Instagram, Myspace, Periscope, Xbox Live with Friends, and YouTube. They would be on the lookout for planned gatherings or post flashing guns or weaponry as well as sudden escalation of violence.

In addition to monitoring criminals, police can use social media to seek assistance from their communities. one such example is with missing persons or wanted suspects. In 2019, Police in Toronto, Ontario (Canada) posted on twitter seeking help locating four missing children. their post was shared over 300 times and the children were located and returned home. Between the year 2017 and 2019, 373 posts were made by 15 police agencies in Canada. They used a technique called crowdsourcing to gather more information for their investigations and create interactive communities of citizens who are ready to participate and engage when communicated with. They have a tendency to prefer Facebook and Twitter due to the ease of liking and sharing their posts. Police also use social media to inform citizens of possible safety issues and take control of the media coverage of investigations. They share press releases, recorded interviews, mug shots and status updates on ongoing investigations. Their tendency to post before stories go public leads to a better control of the flow of information as well as journalist relying on police pages as quick and reliable resources.

== Facebook ==
Facebook, a social network service, is increasingly being used by school administrations and law enforcement agencies as a source of evidence against student users. Allows users to create profile pages with personal details. In the early years of the site, these pages could be viewed by other registered users from the same college, including resident assistants, campus police, or others who signed up for the service. The user privileges and terms of service of the site have since been changed to allow users to control who has the ability to view their content.

Disciplinary actions against students based on information made available on Facebook has spurred debate over the legality and ethics of school administrators' harvesting such information. Facebook spokespeople have made clear that Facebook is a public forum and all information published on the site should be presumed available to the general public, school administrators included. Legal experts agree that public information sources such as Facebook can be legally used in criminal or other investigations.

In the aftermath of the 2011 Vancouver Stanley Cup riot, community participation in assisting police to identify the rioters has been described as unprecedented. Police admitted to being overwhelmed by the amount of evidence provided by social media.

== Cyber-bullying ==
Facebook and other social networking sites are being used to bring bullying outside of school. Students are being targeted on the internet and even mobile devices. A strategy to catch cyber-bullies is being implemented in Reading, Berkshire:

- From February 28, 2011, until May 2011, Thames Valley Police Officers will be using Facebook to catch cyber-bullies. With the help of a teenage volunteer, the police will go through Facebook pages to investigate reported instances of cyber-bullying. If there is anything inappropriate found, a Facebook message will be sent to the offender which will warn them of the consequences of bullying. Along with the message, the student's parents will also receive a letter highlighting the incident and the potential consequences.
- In May 2012, Lake Havasu Unified School District #1 used evidence found on Facebook to catch multiple cyber-bullies after a discussion on a post that the one who felt bullied was not involved in. The school district acquired the list of comments through another student, who printed them out and handed them in to the school administration.
- In Bangalore, India, school students of certain schools were all asked to delete their Facebook profiles in the wake of cyber bullying. Indian law addresses some of the components of cyber-bullying. However, the perpetrators are children and therefore alternatives to criminalization and other policies should be adopted.

== Alcohol policy violations ==
It has become increasingly common for colleges and universities to use Facebook to investigate underage drinking and violations of dry campus policies. Students who violate these policies may be discovered through photographs of illicit drinking behavior, membership in drinking-related groups, or party information posted on the Facebook website. Some examples of such investigations are listed below:

- In October 2005, pictures from Facebook were used to cite violators of university alcohol policy at North Carolina State University. Charges included underage drinking and violations of the dormitory alcohol policy, specifically holding open bottles of alcoholic beverages in the dorm hallway. A dorm resident advisor originally wrote up citations for 14 different students, some of which were dropped. Details were not released by the university, but the incident received news coverage including articles in the official school newspaper and segments on local TV stations.
- In November 2005, four students at Northern Kentucky University were fined for posting pictures of a drinking party on Facebook. The pictures, taken in one of NKU's dormitories, proved that the students were in violation of the university's dry campus policy.
- In November 2005, Emory University officials cited members of the Facebook group "Dobbs 2nd Alcoholics," referring to the second floor of a campus residence hall, for conduct code violations. A similar drinking group, "Wooddruff=Wasted," was also investigated. The group's club members only discussed "having fun in Wooddruff" and said no photos of students were ever posted on Facebook.
- In response to the monitoring, some students have begun to submit "red herring" party listings. In one case at George Washington University, students advertised their party and were raided by campus police. The police found only cake, no alcohol, and later claimed the dorm raid had been triggered by a noise complaint.

== Investigation examples ==
- In December 2004, The Student Life (the student newspaper at Pomona College in Claremont, California) reported that an assistant football coach at the college had been living in the team's equipment room and hosting parties there. The paper cited postings by football players on a Facebook group page titled "We Miss Coach Baker" as evidence of the alleged parties.
- In October 2005, sophomore Cameron Walker was expelled from Fisher College in Boston for comments about a campus police officer made on Facebook. These comments, including the statement that the officer "loves to antagonize students...and needs to be eliminated," were judged to be in violation of the college's code of conduct.
- In October 2005, University of Pennsylvania freshmen student government election results were delayed due to early campaigning violations on Facebook. Though candidates were forbidden from campaigning before a certain date, many Facebook advocacy groups appeared before that date. The University of California, Berkeley, High Point University, and The George Washington University have also experienced similar problems.
- In November 2005, Kansas State University authorities announced that they were using Facebook to investigate a possible violation of the school's honor code potentially involving over 100 students. Students used the message board of a Facebook group to share class information without authorization from the professor.
- In October 2005, Pennsylvania State University police used Facebook to track down students who rushed the field after the October 8 Ohio State game. Two students were later charged with criminal trespass for their involvement.
- In January 2006, Syracuse University's student newspaper, The Daily Orange, featured an article about a student who claimed Syracuse City Police personally warned him in advance about having a party he had listed on Facebook. The university denied the allegations and stated that their own peace officers would have handled the case in any event.
- In February 2006, a 16-year-old Colorado boy was arrested for juvenile possession of a firearm after police saw pictures that he had posted on MySpace of himself posing with rifles and handguns. He was convicted in April 2006.
- In February 2006, The Daily Orange reported about another Syracuse University incident, in which four students were placed on disciplinary probation after creating a group entitled "Clearly [instructor's first name] doesn't know what she's doing ever." The group featured derogatory and personal attacks aimed at the instructor. After meeting with judicial affairs, the students admitted that their comments on the site were inappropriate and accepted an agreement that they would not contact the instructor again.
- In February 2006, police in Oxford, Ohio were directed to the Facebook profile of a Miami University student because it showed the police sketch of a suspect in the rape of another Miami University student as the account owner's personal picture. The police arrested the student and charged him with inducing panic.
- Students that had created a Facebook group to complain about a professor's teaching shortcomings at the University of Louisville were responsible in part for dismissal of that instructor in February 2006. The students were not punished.
- Pictures posted of unrelated parties thrown by students at the University of Connecticut School of Law and Baylor University drew attention to the presence of uninstitutionalized racism on both campuses. In March 2006, Baylor's student newspaper reported a call to action made by outraged students after pictures were posted on Facebook depicting partygoers wearing bandanas and carrying 40-ounce beer bottles wrapped in brown paper, with one young woman sporting layers of bronzer to darken her skin. An advisor for a campus fraternity denied the party was sponsored by the organization and said the party theme was not to dress "ghetto", as critics alleged, but as E-Dawg, a Seattle rapper. Facebook removed the photos from the site as black student groups called for a university-sponsored open forum to discuss the racially insensitive undercurrent on campus. Similar action was taken with the UConn pictures, which depicted a "Bullets and Bubbly" themed party held days after Martin Luther King Jr. Day in 2007. Half the partygoers brought champagne and dressed in formalwear for the "bubbly" portion of the theme, while the other half brought 40 ounces and dressed in do-rags, baggy hip-hop inspired clothing, gold teeth, and in some cases carried fake machine guns. The university responded by holding an open forum discussing the insensitive nature of the party and resulting photos. Controversy over similar parties has also occurred at Clemson University (South Carolina), Tarleton State University (Texas), Texas A&M University, and the University of Chicago.
- In April 2006, University of Dayton student Christopher Herbert was fined approximately $10,000 for damages caused by an annual event known as "LowesFest." Herbert had posted a public invitation to the event on Facebook, though he did not attend the event himself. The university informed him 24 hours before "LowesFest" that he would have to pay for any and all extra costs (police, cleaning, etc.) stemming from that evening. However, Christopher Herbert chose to not pay the fine and he transferred out of the University of Dayton.
- In April 2006, officials at the State University of New York at Cobleskill took a student from Sri Lanka, Tharindu Meepegama into custody after Meepegama posted pictures of him with a shotgun and wrote comments that the school officials found "troubling". Meepegama, who was later allowed to return to the school, said it was all a misunderstanding.
- In August 2006, police officers at the University of Illinois at Urbana-Champaign arrested two students who were spotted urinating in public. One of the students ran, and the other was apprehended by police. When queried about the identity of the student who ran, the student in custody lied saying he did not know him. The arresting officer, upon talking with witnesses, obtained the name of the student who ran. He later found that the two were Facebook friends, and therefore that the questioned student had lied. This student was charged with obstruction of justice.
- In October 2006, a male Southern Illinois University student faced possible expulsion for creating a Facebook page detailing his sexual relationship with a young female he'd been involved with in the past. Other male students added to the page with their own experiences with the woman, until she brought it to the attention of Facebook administrators, who permanently removed the page. The 19-year-old female cited slander while the young man claimed it was an inside joke and assumed she would understand the humor. In an interview he stated, "I never thought something on Facebook would get me into trouble out in the real world." During the debacle, his fellow students created yet another Facebook page with updates on the controversy.
- In December 2006, campus police at the University of North Carolina at Wilmington were investigating the theft of two PlayStation consoles, which had been stolen by the two perpetrators of a beating and robbery on campus. They planned to raid the rented house of Peyton Strickland, an 18-year-old student at nearby Cape Fear Community College. They discovered that the other alleged robber, Ryan Mills, had posted photographs of himself on Facebook in which he posed with guns. Expecting "heavily armed resistance" at Strickland's house, the officers called in a SWAT team for backup to raid Strickland's house. When they arrived at the residence, which three students rented, they were not immediately let in. As one officer began to break down the door with a battering ram, another officer mistook the sound of the battering ram for gunshots and shot through the glass door multiple times, killing the unarmed Strickland and his dog. The officer, Christopher Long, was not charged with second-degree murder by two different grand juries. He was however initially indicted by one grand jury, which was later attributed to a clerical error and overturned. Soon after the incident, Christopher Long went on to receive $1,000 paid out by the sheriff he worked under as well as receiving a "Local Hero" award for $4000.
- In January 2007, several Ottawa employees of Farm Boy were terminated due to their postings on a Facebook group titled "I Got Farm Boy'd."
- In January 2007, a long-standing debate over the University of Illinois at Urbana-Champaign's dancing Chief Illiniwek mascot intensified after racist remarks about Native Americans were discovered on a pro-mascot Facebook group. The group, entitled "If They Get Rid of the Chief, I'm Becoming a Racist," contained wall posts by students that said things like, "What they don't realize is that there never was a racist problem before ... but now I hate redskins and hope all those drunk casino owning bums die." Another student directed a post towards a particularly vocal Native American grad student, saying, "I say we throw a tomahawk into her face." The page was removed, but not before inciting a university investigation into the threats and spawning a counter group entitled "The Chief Dance is Racist, Plain and Simple".
- In February 2007, 11 students at Robert F. Hall Catholic Secondary School in Caledon, Ontario were suspended after posting comments about their principal on Facebook.
- In February 2007, following the fatal hit-and-run death of freshman Carlee Wines, University of Connecticut campus police said they used Facebook to link the suspected driver, Anthony P. Alvino of Lindenhurst, N.Y., to the university. By following leads via Facebook, police learned of the connection between Alvino and his girlfriend, Michele A. Hall, a UConn student. The Long Island, N.Y. newspaper Newsday reported: "Police traced Alvino's connection to UConn through his entry in Facebook, which listed Hall as his girlfriend." Alvino was charged for the hit-and-run, while Hall was charged with helping cover it up and hindering prosecution.
- In April 2007, just days after the Virginia Tech shooting, a student at the SUNY College at Cobleskill was remanded into psychiatric care and suspended from college after posting a photo of himself on his profile with a vaguely threatening message underneath.
- In October 2008, in Edmonton, Alberta, it was revealed that filmmaker Mark Twitchell, who was facing first degree murder charges, had posted as his Facebook status in August that "he had a lot in common with Dexter Morgan". This proved to be a key piece of evidence in the missing person case of John Altinger, as Twitchell was a fan of the television series "Dexter" and it is believed that he murdered Altinger in the style of Dexter's clandestine murders. Shortly after Altinger's disappearance, Twitchell gained access to Altinger's e-mail and Facebook accounts, changing Altinger's Facebook status and e-mailing Altinger's contacts stating that he met a girl online and was planning a move to Costa Rica.
- In 2008, in the city of Cincinnati, police disassembled a local street gang and arrested 71 people following a nine-month investigation with social media to identify the gang's members. Working together with the University of Cincinnati's Institute of Crime Science, the police produced databases of evidence from social networks, current police records and phone documentation, then used software to investigate the information and determine connections between suspects. Cincinnati's social-media attempts started small, with a small number of officers examining online profiles on their own time. Then police joined with the university and obtained training from social-media experts. It was soon determined that felons were using social networks to brag about the offenses they were planning or had already committed, posting incriminating videos, and setting up drug deals. Felons that can't resist boasting online are an advantage to prosecutors and police across the country.
- In one 2008 case, Ronnie Tienda Jr. was convicted of a gang-related homicide in Texas built mainly on incriminating photos and words that he had posted openly on his MySpace page. Today, a person may have their social media information completely private, but their acquaintances or relatives might not be knowledgeable of the law. Police often circumvent proper procedure by finding relatives who unknowingly grant investigators access through their accounts. Drug dealers commonly post inoffensive public updates that incorporate location information so that consumers-and unknowingly, law enforcement-know the location to find them, claimed police. A more debatable tactic to getting evidence from social networks is going undercover online-creating false accounts to make friends with suspects.
- In July 2009, an emergency medical technician in New York City was terminated and arrested for taking a picture of a crime scene and uploading it to Facebook. The technician, 46-year-old Frank Musarella, was charged with "official misconduct".
- Nathalie Blanchard, a Quebec woman on long-term sick leave for depression, sued Manulife after the insurer cut her benefits, claiming that her photos posted on Facebook demonstrated that she had recovered. Blanchard said that she was following her doctor's advice to try to have fun, including nights out at her local bar with friends and short getaways to sun destinations, as a way to forget her problems. She also stated that she had notified Manulife that she was taking a trip. Some experts noted that the privacy controls on Facebook and other social networking sites was "laughable".
- On October 27, 2010, in Kanata Centrum, Ottawa, a collector's edition hazelle jersey and a cap were stolen from an apparel store by four young males. In 15 minutes, the staff were able to use the store's friends list of 324 people who "like" the store and recognized the face of the perpetrators. Police were contacted, found the suspects, and the jersey valued at $1000.00 was recovered.
- On March 17, 2012, San Marinan singer Valentina Monetta was selected to sing Facebook Uh, Oh, Oh for Eurovision Song Contest 2012. People who were on the social network pointed out that the lyrics contained a commercial message for Facebook. The lyrics of the song that contained references to Facebook were banned from the contest on March 18. The banned lyrics must be replaced no later than March 22. If the banned lyrics are not replaced, Valentina's other song will be selected on that day.
- In July 2017, the Philippine National Bureau of Investigation is monitoring any activity of Pastor Hokage groups, after complaints from victims that their photos have been shared without permission.
- On October 16, 2023, singer and internet personality Dalal Abu Amneh was arrested by the Israeli Police over a social media post for allegedly promoting hate speech and inciting violence on social media following a massacre perpetrated by Hamas on October 7, 2023.

== See also ==
- Forensic profiling – Study of trace evidence in criminal investigations
- List of social networking services
- Social media intelligence – Tools for analyzing and synchronizing data from social media websites
