= Slave Girl =

Slave Girl or The Slave Girl may refer to:

- The Slave Girl (1915 film), American short Western
- Slave Girl (1947 film) an American Technicolor adventure comedy film
- The Slave Girl (play), 1530 Croatian drama
- They Came on Viking Ships, 2005 Australian children's historical novel which was retitled as Slave Girl in 2007
- The Slave Girl (1977 novel), written by Buchi Emecheta
- Slave Girl, a fictional character in Brian K. Vaughan's comic book series Saga
