= Haisley (given name) =

- Gender: feminine

Origin
- Origin: English
- Meaning: Various

Haisley is a modern created given name of English origin or a spelling variant and transferred use of the surname or place name Hazley or Hazeleigh or Hazeley, a name which has various origins, among them a place name meaning “enclosure on the hill” or “wet haylands.” The surname might also be derived from the Old English name Haegel in combination with the word “leah” meaning forest clearing.

The popularity of the name coincides with the popularity of similar sounding names such as Hazel and Paisley in the United States. Two-syllable surname names and names ending in -lee or -ley are currently fashionable for girls in the United States.

== Popularity ==
The name has been among the one thousand most popular names for girls in the United States since 2018 and among the top five hundred since 2020.

Variants in use include Haislee, Haisleigh, Hayeslee, Hayslee, Haysley, Hayzlee, Hayzleigh, Hayzley, Hayzlie, Hazelee, Hazeleigh, Hazeley, Hazely, Hazle, Hazlee, Hazleigh, Hazley, and Hazlie.
