= Hazley =

Hazley is a surname. Notable people with the surname include:

- Matthew Hazley (born 1987), Northern Irish footballer
- Ray Hazley (born c. 1959), Irish Gaelic footballer and hurler

== See also ==
- Haisley (given name)
