= Hazel Perfect =

British mathematician

Hazel Perfect (c. 1927 – 8 July 2015) was a British mathematician specialising in combinatorics.

== Contributions ==
Perfect was known for inventing gammoids,^{[AMG]} for her work with Leon Mirsky on doubly stochastic matrices,^{[SP2]} for her three books Topics in Geometry,^{[TIG]} Topics in Algebra,^{[TIA]} and Independence Theory in Combinatorics,^{[ITC]} and for her work as a translator (from an earlier German translation) of Pavel Alexandrov's book An Introduction to the Theory of Groups (Hafner, 1959).^{[ITG]}

The Perfect–Mirsky conjecture, named after Perfect and Leon Mirsky, concerns the region of the complex plane formed by the eigenvalues of doubly stochastic matrices. Perfect and Mirsky conjectured that for $n\times n$ matrices this region is the union of regular polygons of up to $n$ sides, having the roots of unity of each degree up to $n$ as vertices. Perfect and Mirsky proved their conjecture for $n\le 3$; it was subsequently shown to be true for $n=4$ and false for $n=5$, but remains open for larger values of $n$.^{[SP2]}

== Education and career ==
Perfect earned a master's degree through Westfield College (a constituent college for women in the University of London) in 1949, with a thesis on The Reduction of Matrices to Canonical Form. In the 1950s, Perfect was a lecturer at University College of Swansea; she collaborated with Gordon Petersen, a visitor to Swansea at that time, on their translation of Alexandrov's book. She completed her Ph.D. at the University of London in 1969; her dissertation was Studies in Transversal Theory with Particular Reference to Independence Structures and Graphs. She became a reader in mathematics at the University of Sheffield.

== Selected publications ==
=== Books ===
TIG.	Perfect, Hazel (1963), Topics in Geometry, Pergamon, MR 0155210

TIA.	Perfect, Hazel (1966), Topics in Algebra, Pergamon

ITC.	Bryant, Victor; Perfect, Hazel (1980), Independence Theory in Combinatorics: An introductory account with applications to graphs and transversals, London and New York: Chapman & Hall, ISBN 0-412-16220-2, MR 0604173

=== Research papers ===
SP2.	Perfect, Hazel; Mirsky, L. (1965), "Spectral properties of doubly-stochastic matrices", Monatshefte für Mathematik, 69: 35–57, doi:10.1007/BF01313442, MR 0175917, S2CID 120466093

AMG.	Perfect, Hazel (1968), "Applications of Menger's graph theorem", Journal of Mathematical Analysis and Applications, 22: 96–111, doi:10.1016/0022-247X(68)90163-7, MR 0224494

=== Translation ===
ITG.	Alexandroff, P. S. (1959), An Introduction to the Theory of Groups, translated by Perfect, Hazel; Petersen, G. M., New York: Hafner Publishing Co., MR 0099361
