= Hazel Brown =

Trinbagonian women's and consumer rights activist (1942–2022)

Hazel Angela Brown (31 January 1942 – 22 September 2022) was a Trinbagonian women's and consumer rights activist. She was a co-founder and coordinator of the Network of NGOs for the Advancement of Women. She was secretary general of the Commonwealth Women's Network.

== Early life ==
Hazel Browne was born on 31 January 1942 in East Dry River, Belmont, Port of Spain, to Una Browne and Carlis Browne. She attended Gloster Lodge Moravian Primary School and received a scholarship to study at Bishop Anstey High School. She also attended St. Joseph's Convent in San Fernando.

Brown graduated from Cipriani Labour College in 1969; she was one of the first students to graduate from the school.

== Career ==
Brown was involved with community organisation projects, research, and social development as early as 1969. She focussed on gender equality, consumers' rights, and the elimination of poverty.

Brown was a crucial figure in the development of the Housewives Association of Trinidad and Tobago (HATT), an organisation promoting consumer rights awareness which was founded in 1971. The work of HATT led to the establishment of the Trinidad and Tobago Bureau of Standards in 1974. She was also a co-founder of the Telephone Users Group in 1971. Through the group, utility customers participated in hearings over utility rates that resulted in changes to the rate structures of electricity and water.

In 1976, Brown made an unsuccessful bid as an independent candidate for the Port of Spain East seat in the House of Representatives.

Brown and 13 others founded the Network of NGOs for the Advancement of Women in 1985, an umbrella organisation for non-governmental organisations that focus on women's issues. It was formed to present the position of women in Trinidad and Tobago at the 1985 World Conference on Women in Nairobi.

In 1987 Brown said that the outlook for women under the National Alliance for Reconstruction and then-Prime Minister A. N. R. Robinson was "bleak and dangerous", stating that "there is a lot of lip service being paid to the idea of the upliftment of women in the society but that is all. Mr. Robinson is the problem because there is a gap between his stated position on issues, including women, and his actions. But the whole change process will not work unless there is proper participation by women." Along with Grace Talma, she challenged the government's Policy Statement on Women which was approved by the cabinet in 1987. In response to the policy statement, she and other women's NGOs drafted a National Paper on the Status of Women in 1990.

Brown coordinated the participation of Trinidadian and Tobagonian NGOs in United Nations conferences. She was the coordinator for the Caribbean Region Preparatory Process Project of the 1995 World Summit for Social Development conference. She was responsible for the participation of NGOs at the 1995 Beijing UN Women's Conference and was part of the negotiation sessions for the Beijing Platform for Action. She worked organising women for political office with EMILY's List. Brown led the Network of NGOs for the Advancement of Women's 'Put a Woman' project during the 2000 and 2001 elections, which encouraged people to vote for women candidates.

In 2006, she became coordinator for the Network of NGOs for the Advancement of Women.

Brown endorsed Kamla Persad-Bissessar for the 2010 campaign for Prime Minister.

Brown served as Secretary General of the Commonwealth Women's Network and was a special envoy for women and girls with the Ministry of Gender, Youth and Child Development. In 2011 she was appointed to Commonwealth Caribbean as a special envoy on women and children's issues. She also advocated on behalf of adopting a National Gender Policy and served as a member of the Draft Gender Policy committee. She took part in panel discussions and training seminars with the Women's Arm of the United National Congress.

Brown served on the boards of the Telecommunications Authority of Trinidad and Tobago, the Trinidad and Tobago Agribusiness Association, and the Diego Martin Consumer Cooperative Society.

Brown advocated on behalf of economic opportunities for HIV-positive women. Since 1992, she promoted the use of solar box cookers as an affordable and environmentally friendly way to prepare food.

== Awards and honours ==
In 2011, Brown received the Medal for the Development of Women (Gold) for advancing women's rights in Trinidad and Tobago.

In March 2015, a conference was held honouring her achievements titled Fearless Politics: The Life and Times of Hazel Brown. The Network of NGOs for the Advancement of Women donated a collection of Brown's documents to the Alma Jordan Library of the University of the West Indies, establishing the Hazel Brown Special Collection.

In 2017 she was awarded an Honorary Doctor of Laws (LLD) by the University of the West Indies at St. Augustine for "her untiring work in women's development, consumer rights and poverty eradication". St. Joseph's Convent inducted her into its Past Pupils' Hall of Excellence in November 2019.

== Personal life ==
Hazel married Herman Brown at the age of 20. They had three children—Leah, Carla and Garvin. Brown's husband died when the children were young. Her youngest child Natasha, with father Philip C. Nunez, was born in 1974.

Brown was diagnosed with cancer in the 1990s. She became an advocate for cancer survivors and was honoured by the Guyana Cancer Society. Towards the end of her life, she also had Parkinson's disease and diabetes.

Brown died at the age of 80 on 22 September 2022 at her home in Diamond Vale, Diego Martin. She was interred at Lapeyrouse Cemetery.
