= Hazelle =

Hazelle is a feminine given name. Notable people with the name include:

- Hazelle Goodman (born 1959), Trinidad and Tobago actress
- Hazelle P. Rogers (born 1952), American politician

== See also ==
- Hazel (given name)
