= Hazel Hitson Weidman =

American anthropologist

- Born: August 3, 1923
- Died: April 22, 2024 (aged 100)
- Education: Radcliffe College
- Occupation: Medical anthropologist
- Organization: Society of Medical Anthropology

Hazel Marie Hitson Weidman (August 3, 1923 - April 22, 2024) was an American medical anthropologist. She was a pioneer in the field whose groundbreaking work left an enduring mark on the intersection of anthropology and medicine. Her career spanned several decades and encompassed significant contributions to medical anthropology and healthcare practices, including a key organizing force behind the formation of the Society for Medical Anthropology.

== Early life and education ==
Hazel was born on 3 August 1923 in Taft, California, to parents Frederick "Tex" and Estell (née Griesemer) Hitson. She spent her early years in California where she freely explored the surrounding desert.

In 1943, shortly after graduating from Taft Union High School, Weidman joined the World War II war effort by enlisting in the WAVES. She attended boot camp at the U.S. Naval Training School at Hunter College in Bronx, New York. There she was assigned to the Atlanta Naval Air Station where she received training to instruct pilots in celestial navigation, instrumental flight, and radio navigation. Weidman was taught by Naval Air Station pilots to fly airplanes by “the seat of her pants”. She served at several naval air bases until the end of WWII, including the Alameda and Livermore Naval Air Stations in California and the New Orleans Naval Air Station.

In 2005, Weidman's WAVES uniform was on display at the Radcliffe Institute’s Schlesinger Library in Boston in a special exhibit on female military service. She participated in a 2014 Honor Flight, a program that commemorates veterans through memorial site visits in Washington, D.C.

Following her naval service and using her G.I. Bill, Weidman attended Northwestern University, majoring in anthropology, graduating in 1951 with a B.S. Her primary career interests were in medical organization and healthcare practices, but she knew an anthropological perspective gained from her undergraduate experience could provide insight into the medical field and pursued graduate studies.

She graduated from Radcliffe College at Harvard, earning her M.A. in 1957 and Ph.D. in Social Relations in 1959. Weidman traveled to Myanmar (formerly Burma) in 1957 as part of her graduate research, leading to her doctoral dissertation “Family Patterns and Paranoid Personality Structure in Boston and Burma”, exploring mental health across different cultures. Her dissertation led to numerous positions with states and public agencies concerning issues of health and culture.

She met her husband, William "Bill" Harold Weidman, while working at the Massachusetts Department of Public Health, and they married in 1960 and had three children.

== Career ==
Weidman worked at several medical agency positions in Massachusetts and California from 1959 to 1964. Conducted with her husband, Dr. William Weidman, her work on tuberculosis control in Massachusetts led to new control legislation. She was also involved in staff training and hospital administration at Fresno County Hospital, and she developed a program in California for the protection of battered children.

Weidman joined the College of William and Mary faculty as a social anthropology professor from 1964 to 1965 and at the University of Alabama Medical Center from 1965 to 1967. She later taught at the University of Miami in the Department of Psychiatry and Department of Anthropology from 1968 until her retirement in 1988. After retirement Weidman continued to work at the university's Division of Child and Adolescent Psychiatry focusing on clinical training of residents.

While at the University of Miami in 1981, Weidman helped establish a community mental health program, O.T.E.R. (Office of Transcultural Education and Research). The O.T.E.R explored the connection between healthcare outcomes and patients’ cultural beliefs and traditions and training medical practitioners to provide quality healthcare while cognizant of varying ethnic backgrounds.

The Papers of Hazel Hitson Weidman, including her professional and personal papers, can be found at the Harvard Peabody Museum Archives and Schlesinger Library at the Radcliffe Institute at Harvard.

== Society for Medical Anthropology ==
Hazel Weidman’s career put her at the center of a growing number of professionals interested in the new area of medical anthropology, chairing the Steering Committee of the Group for Medical Anthropology, a group that received recognition as a formal institution, the Society for Medical Anthropology (SMA), in 1970. The Medical Anthropology Quarterly (MAQ), an internationally published journal, originated as the Medical Anthropology Newsletter and acted as the group’s discussion method between annual meetings, of which Weidman was its first editor.

In recognition of the career-long service to SMA by Dr. Hazel Weidman, in 2017, they established the Hazel Weidman Award for Exemplary Service, presented to a member every two years who embodies the same career-long service to the field of medical anthropology.

== Works ==
- Weidman, Hazel Hitson, “The Self-Concept As a Crucial Link between Social Science and Psychiatric Theory.” Transcultural Psychiatric Research Review. Volume 6, no. 2 (1969): 113–16.
- Weidman, Hazel Hitson, “Falling-out: A Diagnostic and Treatment Problem Viewed from a Transcultural Perspective." Social Science and Medicine. Volume 13, no. B (1979): 95-112.
- Weidman, Hazel Hitson, and Conference on Mental Health Research in Asia and the Pacific (1966: East-West Center). “Values, Concept of Self, and Projection: The Burma Case.”
- Weidman, Hazel, and Janice A Egeland. “A Behavioral Science Perspective in the Comparative Approach to the Delivery of Health Care.” (1972).
- Weidman, Hazel H. “Research Strategies, Structural Alterations and Clinically Applied Anthropology.” (1982).
- Weidman, Hazel H. Culture Brokerage and Culture Mediation: Emergent Strategies in Mental Health Care.” (1974).
- Weidman, Hazel H. “Which Way Anger?: An Inquiry into the Nature of Systematic Relationships between Family Patterns, Basic Personality Disposition, and Forms of Mental Illness.” (1963).
- Weidman, Hazel Hitson. “Anthropological Theory and the Psychological Function of Belief in Witchcraft.” Essays on Medical Anthropology, (1968).
- Wittkower, Eric D, and Hazel Hitson Weidman. “Magical Thought and the Integration of Psychoanalytic and Anthropological Theory.” Honolulu: University of Hawaii, Social Science Research Institute, (1968).
- Weidman, Hazel Hitson. "Guest Editorial: On Getting from "Here" to "There"". Medical Anthropology Newsletter. Volume 8, No. 1 (1976): 2–7.
- Weidman, Hazel H. "Origins: Reflections on the History of the SMA and Its Official Publication". Medical Anthropology Quarterly. Volume 17, No. 5 (1986):115–124.
