= List of Saga characters =

Cover to Saga #1 (March 2012). Art by Fiona Staples.

The following is a list of characters from Brian K. Vaughan and Fiona Staples' epic space opera/fantasy comic book series Saga, which debuted in 2012 by Image Comics. It depicts a husband and wife from long-warring extraterrestrial races, Alana and Marko, fleeing authorities from both sides of a galactic war as they struggle to care for their newborn daughter, Hazel, who occasionally narrates the series. In the series (and herein), each issue is referred to as a Chapter, and each story arc, which consists of usually six Chapters, is referred to as a Volume.

== The family and its allies ==
=== Alana ===
First appearance: Chapter 1

The female lead of the series. She is Marko's wife, and mother to Hazel. Her father is Rustik, her mother has not been named, and her stepmother is her best friend from childhood, Even.

Alana is a native of the technologically advanced Landfall, the largest planet in the galaxy, whose people have wings that give them the power of flight. Unlike other Landfallians, Alana believed her wings were vestigial and nonfunctional, until discovering otherwise in issue #18. Landfallians speak a tongue called Language.

Alana is an only child. Her stepmother, Even, is a young woman that Alana knew since they met at a summer camp. Even met Alana's father long after she was out of high school, and after Alana's parents had legally separated. Even says that Alana took the wedding "Great, all things considered," and that Alana had been going through "some hard stuff at that age", but one of the couple's wedding photos shows Alana scowling at the newlyweds, and she joined the armed forces a few months after Even moved in, and never set foot again on Landfall. (Note: Chapter 1 previously indicated that she was drafted after flunking out of state college, while the revised circumstances of her joining the military are from issue 14.)

All of Alana's uncles were slaughtered by Wreathers at Southmoor. After joining her planet's war against the Wreathers, she was subsequently reprimanded for "abject cowardice" following her first experience in battle, which occurred when as a Private first class, she was stationed as a tank gunner and bombardier on the planet Mota. Though she had previously distinguished herself at Wettingham, her commanding officer, Countess Robot X, ordered her to destroy a bridge to prevent it from being used by Wreath troops to access an island where a Landfallian platoon was trapped. Alana initially refused because the bridge was filled with civilians. When pressed by the Countess, who pointed out that any military-age civilian not actively resisting Wreathers was a "clean target", Alana complied, sending a hundred vehicles into the water below, but was nonetheless punished by the Countess for her hesitancy by being redeployed to the planet Cleave, where as a prison guard she met Marko. While in captivity, Alana read to Marko A Night Time Smoke by D. Oswald Heist, a romance novel about a man made of rock and a rich quarry owner's daughter, which Alana stated was the best book she ever read, and which altered her outlook on life. When Alana learned that Marko was to be transferred to Blacksite, a prison from which detainees never return, she freed him from his shackles so that he could escape, just twelve hours after having met him. She later married him, and gave birth to their daughter, Hazel, which occurs in the opening scene of the premiere issue.

An only child, Alana dismisses emphasis on the family as a justification for a given course of action, calling it the "rallying cry of losers", explaining that her father sacrificed his life by working a job he hated in order to support his family, even though she believes it also made him abusive toward her and her mother during the few times he was present in their lives, including physical abuse he used to inflict on her mother. Despite this, she has found herself employing this rationale herself when protecting Hazel.

In volume 4, after the family has settled on Gardenia, Alana pursues a career in acting, joining the underground program Open Circuit, in which all the players wear masks and voice changers. Her stint in this occupation ends when Dengo kidnaps her and her family, after which the character she played, Zipless, was recast with another actress. Over the years, Hazel will have seen some of her episodes. In volume 5, she, Hazel, and Klara are captured by the robot Dengo. Three months later, she reunited with Marko, though Hazel is taken to a Coalition juvenile detention facility for Wreath children. By the end of Volume 6, she and Marko have rescued Hazel, and learn that Alana is pregnant with her second child.

Although skin color is not a part of racial ethnicity that is explicitly addressed within the books' dialogue, writer Brian K. Vaughan and artist Fiona Staples have indicated that both Alana and Marko are people of color, and Staples designed Alana with darker skin. She envisioned her to be biracial, and her father as an Indian man.

=== Marko ===
First appearance: Chapter 1
Killed in: Chapter 54

The male lead of the series, Alana's husband, Hazel's father, and son of Barr and Klara.

Marko grew up on Landfall's moon, Wreath, whose people have horns or antlers and can wield magic. Wreathers speak a tongue called Blue, rendered as blue text. Like Alana, he is an only child. By the time he was born, the front lines in the Landfall-Wreath War had already been moved to distant proxy wars, waged mostly by unlucky draftees or conscripts from other worlds. Despite the endless conflict, Hazel says that her father's childhood was "by all accounts, a pretty decent life." Marko's first memory is of the day when, as a boy, his parents took him to the site of the final battle fought on Wreath. Using a spell that required Klara to cut the palm of her hand and spill her blood on the land, they showed Marko images of that battle, as the moon's soil still remembered the massacre that happened that day. Barr and Klara said nothing, but their point was clear: Never forget the countless heroic Wreathers who sacrificed so much. From that moment, Marko was infused with hatred of the wings.

When he was a child, Marko had a pet dog named Rumfer. During a seminal episode when he was seven years old, he caught the daughter of one of his neighbors practicing fire spells on Rumfer. He saw that she badly burned Rumfer's tail, and caused Rumfer to let out yelps of pain. Watching her casually hurt another living thing, especially a smaller, defenseless animal, Marko reacted by beating her so badly that she attained a black eye and a bloody nose. When the girl's mother angrily presented the girl to Marko's father, Barr apologized to the girl. And after she and her mother left their home, Barr stripped off Marko's shirt and whipped him badly with his belt, during which a tearful Marko thanked his father repeatedly. Years later, Marko called this the worst day of his life, and regards as the worst part of the experience the look on Barr's face when he saw what his son had done. As Marko described Barr as "the sweetest, gentlest man who's ever lived", his disappointment in Marko hurt Marko more than any physical suffering Marko had ever experienced. As a result, Marko feels a strong aversion to any sort of violence against women, even the mild play-slapping of the buttocks during sex, and is overcome with guilt at having thrown a bag of groceries at Alana after finding out that she was taking the hallucinogenic drug Fadeaway. Rumfer later died after being hit by his school bus when Marko was twelve.

Marko and his first fiancée, Gwendolyn, got engaged when they were in what the Landfallians would call high school, and planned to marry after Marko got back from the war, in which he would serve as a foot soldier in his people's war against the Coalition of Landfall. When Marko left Wreath, he was still a "gung-ho kid who just wanted to do [his] moon proud and kick some ass." This all changed the first time he saw battle. When he tried to share these misgivings with Gwen, she replied in her letters to him by merely encouraging him to "fight the good fight". As Marko found himself maturing with the development of a new outlook, he tried to share these ideas with Gwendolyn, and realized from her unsympathetic and jingoistic responses that she was "frozen in place", and that they had drifted apart so much that continuing their relationship would never work. Alana did not learn of Gwen until Marko was delirious following his being wounded on Cleave as they attempted to make their way to the Rocketship Forest.

Marko surrendered to Coalition forces as a "conscientious objector" 18 months before the beginning of the series. He was a prisoner of war on the planet Cleave, where he was Prisoner 9763572, and one of his guards was Alana. After Marko and Alana escaped together, married and bore Hazel, Wreath High Command sent The Will after Marko because Marko "renounced his oath and betrayed The Narrative" by fraternizing with an enemy combatant. Marko felt he was insecure, angry and selfish before he met Alana. At first Marko "annoyed the shit out of" Alana, as she found him to be "a self-righteous ass", did not think he knew how to sit still, and was put off by his tendency to laugh at his own jokes. Alana and Marko's wedding rings belonged to Gwendolyn's grandparents, who spoke two different dialects of Wreath's native tongue, and had their rings enchanted with a translator spell. The rings work for all persons who are in the vicinity of those wearing them, though the exact range has not been specified.

In Volume Four, Marko takes his father's name, Barr, as an alias, when the family settles down on Gardenia. After Dengo takes their families hostage (a "split up" that Hazel first alludes to her parents having suffered in Chapter 19), Marko teams with Prince Robot IV, Yuma and Ghüs, to find them. In Volume Five, while pursuing his family, Marko, despite his anger at Alana for taking Fadeaway, and at Yuma for having given it to her, tries some himself, after Yuma tells him that she believes that Alana was drawn to try Fadeaway because she wanted peace. Despite the disagreeable nature of the ensuing overdose, Marko later says, that for the first time in a long time, he feels like he understands both Alana and himself, and his resolve to find his family and kill Dengo is strengthened. Despite this, it would be years before he would see Hazel again.

Though he is a pacifist who vows upon the birth of Hazel to never again to use his sword, and dislikes the practice of owning firearms, he does so nonetheless when his family is threatened, and is so skilled with a sword that he can dispatch an entire squad of armed enemy soldiers, for which he is referred to by Prince Robot IV as a "force of nature". Marko is a vegetarian. On the subject of dancing, Marko has stated that he had such bad coordination that he once broke a staff sergeant's toe trying to march in formation.

Fiona Staples designed Marko and his family to appear Asian, having used a handful of Japanese models and actors as reference when finalizing their designs. Responding to perceptions of them as Caucasian, Staples has stated, "I can see why people sometimes mistake him for white, because I avoided using exaggerated racial markers (slanted eyes, rounded nose, etc.). With simple cartoon drawings like these, a lot is left to the reader's imagination. So I accept there will be some misidentification because I didn't draw Marko's family like Mulan characters."

=== Hazel ===
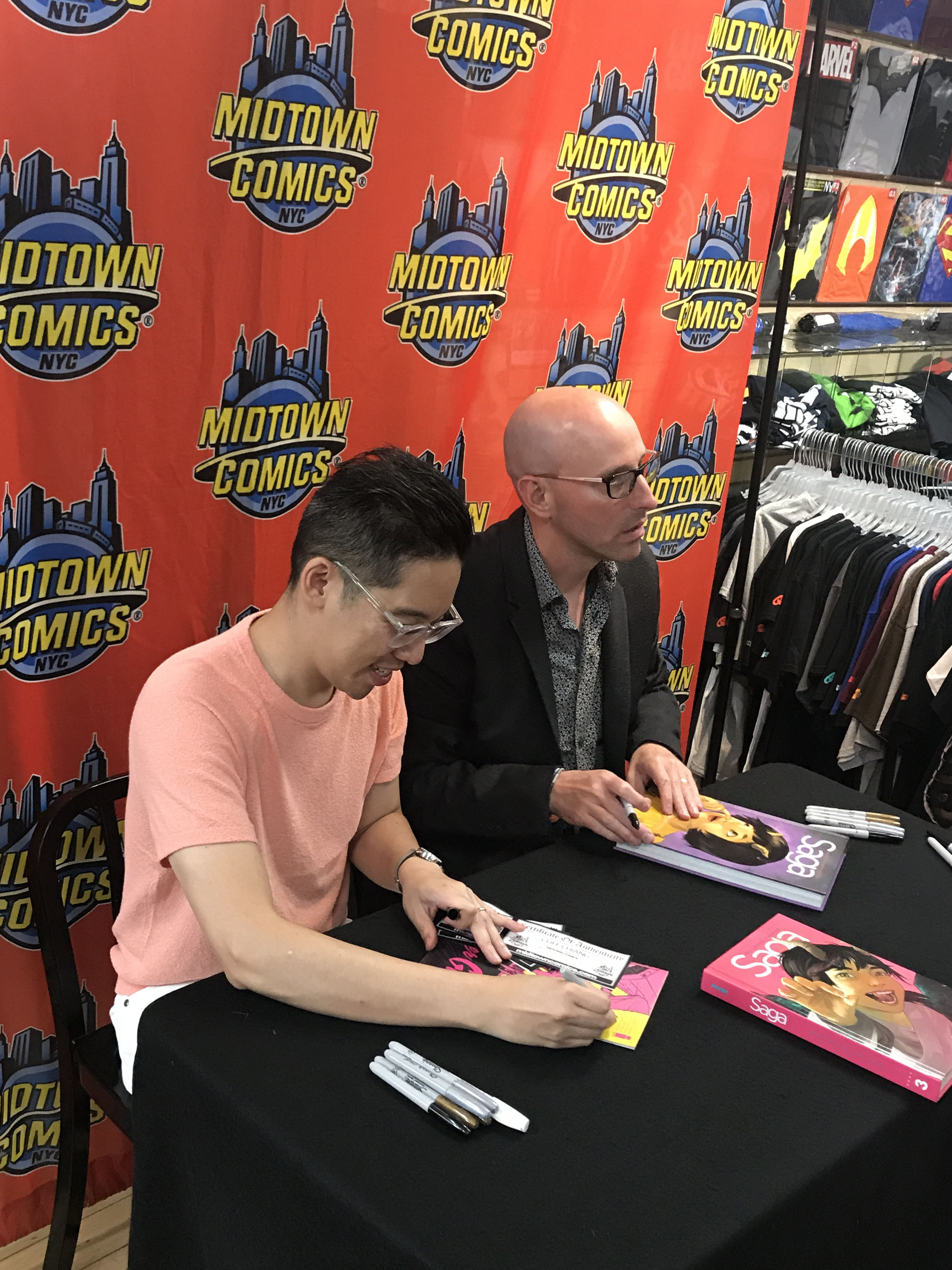
Vaughan (right), at Midtown Comics in Manhattan with artist Cliff Chiang (left). Vaughan is signing different volumes collecting the series, each of which shows Hazel on the covers.

First appearance: Chapter 1
Alana and Marko's daughter, born on the planet Cleave in the first issue, who occasionally narrates the series. She has wings like her mother, horns like her father, and green-brown eyes unlike those of either of her parents. Conceived following a fight between her parents, she was named after the librarian who first recommended the work of D. Oswald Heist to Alana. She spends most of her childhood growing up in the organic tree-like rocketship with which she and her parents escape Cleave. She is seen taking her first steps at the end of Volume Three, and is speaking in simple phrases by the beginning of Volume Four.

During her life on Gardenia, she has a doll named Ponk Konk. After she and the family are kidnapped by Dengo, Marko keeps it with him while he searches for them. Barr made Hazel a winter coat when she was a baby, which she wears in Volume 5. Hazel always hated romantic comedies. As an adult, she still has a scrap of the garment Barr created shortly after meeting her and Alana, and uses it as a bookmark. She says that although many men have pursued her during her life as a fugitive, only one ever broke her heart.

After Hazel, her mother and grandmother are kidnapped by Dengo, it was years before she would see her father again. When Dengo contacts the Fourth Cell of the Last Revolution, the cell's captain, Quain, makes a deal with one of the two governments to free a thousand of the Revolution's members in exchange for Hazel, but Dengo has a change of heart and kills Quain before this can happen. By the time this crisis is resolved, Hazel is separated from both of her parents, and remanded to a Coalition juvenile detention facility for Wreath children, which adjoins a prison where Klara is imprisoned. There, Hazel bonds with a sympathetic teacher named Noreen, and also meets trans woman prisoner named Petrichor, who becomes part of the family. By the end of Volume 6, Noreen aids in Hazel and Petrichor's rescue by Alana and Marko, and Hazel learns her mother is pregnant with Hazel's brother.

Brian K. Vaughan has stated that while time works a bit differently in the Saga universe than it does in real life, Hazel is roughly 19 Earth months old as of Chapter 19. She has taken her first steps by Chapter 18, and has begun speaking by Chapter 19. In Volume 5, Hazel is speaking in more coherent, full sentences. Volume Ten is set three years after Marko's death, and a week after Hazel's tenth birthday, making her the same age the series at the time.

Hazel's narration is hand-lettered by Fiona Staples, using her own handwriting, which is the last thing she does after finishing the artwork on a page.

=== Izabel ===
First appearance: Chapter 2
Killed in: Chapter 38

Izabel is the ghost of a teenage girl from the planet Cleave who was killed by a landmine. She first appears in issue 2, after Marko has been seriously wounded by The Stalk, and offers help in healing him. Alana reluctantly makes a deal with Izabel to save Marko's life in exchange for taking Izabel with them when they leave the planet, but because Izabel is connected to Cleave, she can only leave the planet if she is bonded to the soul of another native. Alana agrees to bond the soul of Hazel, who was born on Cleave, upon which Izabel becomes a babysitter to Hazel at nighttime, the only time of day when Izabel manifests herself. She proves effective in this role, having been the oldest of seven children.

Izabel manifests as a reddish torso with her intestines hanging out from under the hem of her T-shirt. She comes from a family of resistance fighters who built tunnels to escape invaders to Cleave. She and the other ghosts of Cleave, who see themselves as its spiritual protectors, can project illusions into the minds of people, for which the ghosts have been dubbed the "Horrors" of Cleave. The ghosts can use these illusions to disguise their appearance, although they do not work on machines, such as the Robots. Though she observes that it is probably her patriotic duty to stay on Cleave and haunt the enemy, she says her heart was barely in the fight when she was alive, and she just wants some peace and quiet.

According to Izabel, every night she dreams about her ex-girlfriend, Windy. However, Windy was also an avid follower of what Izabel calls their planet's "most judgy religion", for which Izabel eventually broke up with her. Two days later, Izabel stepped on the landmine that killed her, and as she bled out, all she could think was how she would never feel Windy's breath on her neck again. At this, Izabel realized the absurdity of how she needed to die in order to realize how precious their relationship was, a point she relates to Alana, following a fight between Alana and Marko.

Keith Silva of Comics Bulletin has called her the series' most unique character.

=== Klara ===
First appearance: Chapter 6

Marko's mother, and wife of Barr, who first appears with Barr at the end of Chapter #6. Her mother died in an incident at Langencamp at the hands of Landfallians, and thus Klara is less accepting of Marko and Alana's relationship when she and Barr first meet her. A warrior herself, she fought at the Battle of Cartwright, from which she still has shrapnel in her buttocks.

Klara met Barr at a youth hostel in the Craters. He was, as she puts it, "a goofy-looking" design student who told the single filthiest joke she had ever heard. According to Hazel, following Barr's death, Klara never loved anyone the way she loved Barr, though she did love again.

After being separated from Alana and Marko, she, Hazel and Lexis are taken to a Coalition detention center. Though Alana and Marko eventually rescue Hazel, Klara decides to remain at the prison.

Brian K. Vaughan, when asked which character was his favorite, stated that Klara is the easiest to write.

=== Barr ===
First appearance: Chapter 6
Died in: Chapter 11

Marko's father, and husband to Klara, who first appears with Klara at the end of issue #6. Unlike his wife, Barr is immediately accepting of Alana's relationship with Marko, and uses his skills as an armorer to weave her protective garments with a spinning wheel. He reveals soon after meeting her that he has less than a month to live, but asks Alana not to reveal this to Marko or his mother, as he does not want their pity or sorrow. Barr relates that his own father, who died less than a year after Marko was born, once told him that one's first grandchild is nature's reminder of one's own mortality. Barr dies from the strain of casting a spell that aids in his family's escape from a giant space entity.

Barr is an armorer who can create garments that are ray-proof and gunpowder resistant, though not of much use against bladed weapons. He has been seen creating such garments from the wooden spinning wheel conjured by the rocketship treehouse.

When Marko was seven years old, he caught the daughter of one of his neighbors practicing fire spells on his pet dog, Rumfer. Marko beat her so badly that she attained a black eye and a bloody nose. When the girl's mother angrily presented the girl to Marko's father, Barr apologized to the girl. And after she and her mother left their home, Barr stripped off Marko's shirt and whipped him badly with his belt. Years later, Marko would regard the worst part of the experience as the look on Barr's face when he saw what his son had done. As Marko described Barr as "the sweetest, gentlest man who's ever lived," his disappointment in Marko hurt Marko more than any physical suffering Marko had ever experienced. For his part, Barr feels that he was never a great father to Marko, but was always loyal to his mother.

During his short time on the rocketship, Barr made Hazel a winter coat when she was a baby, which she wears in Volume 5. He also creates a garment for Hazel, a scrap from which the adult Hazel says she uses as a bookmark.

Barr dies from the strain of casting a spell that aids in his family's escape from a spaceborne entity called a timesuck. The next morning the family cremates his remains in the belly of the rocketship. According to Hazel, Klara never loved anyone the way she loved Barr, though she did love again.

Marko takes the alias Barr after the family take refuge on Gardenia.

=== D. Oswald Heist ===
First mentioned: Chapter 3
First appearance: Chapter 12
Killed in: Chapter 17

Writer known for over forty novels, including A Nighttime Smoke (which is long out of print) Untouched by Man, and the unpublished The Opposite of War. He has been nominated for one or more awards called Loupers. He did not write any children's books, despite his love of them, because it would require working with an artist, and artists "frighten" him.

Heist lives in an old "cosmic lighthouse" near a quarry on the fog-covered "lighthouse planet" Quietus, where Marko and Alana's family take refuge in Volume Three, after having been inspired by the antiwar message in A Nighttime Smoke. Alana in particular was so moved by that book that she regards Heist as "the smartest person in the universe." A quote from Chapter 15 that both Alana and Marko find memorable is by a character named Eames, who says, "There are two kinds of people in this world. Consumers and destroyers. We used to have creators, but they all ran away."

Heist and his first wife, Missy, are cyclopeans originally from the planet Cartwright. Missy was killed when an errant high-explosive spell fired by Wreath forces hit the house of her parents on Cartwright, where she was visiting with her newborn son during the siege at the Battle of Cartwright. His son, Parone, survived the explosion, but when he grew into adulthood, he volunteered to fight for Landfall after an incident at Threshold None, and later hanged himself after coming home from the war. Heist's second wife was Yuma, a painter who does set design for an entertainment program called the Open Circuit.

Klara thought A Night Time Smoke was "donkey shit" and "claptrap" written by a "reprobate", and reacted to the drunken Heist vomiting all over Hazel when first meeting the family by calling him a "pickled imbecile". Despite this, she soon bonded with him over their mutual bereavement of their spouses, which Heist was able to easily detect in Klara. Although both Klara and Izabel noticed that Heist was attracted to Klara, Klara was not interested in recriprocating, as this was only a few weeks after Barr's death.

Though Heist is pleased that Alana and Marko understood A Night Time Smoke's pro-peace subtext, she is surprised when he mentions the need for employment, having thought that the book's message was that people should "spend [their] lives doing pretty much just hanging out and stuff". Heist is surprised that someone would interpret the 435-page novel that he spent three years writing as a call to do nothing. Heist says that he abhors real violence, but says that "fake violence is fucking brilliant", and names Crotz's My Heads on Swivels as a work of fiction that accurately conveys what combat is really like, calling it "beyond horrific". In contrast to Klara, Heist does not believe that war is justified even to defend one's land, saying that "Dirt is dirt."

After the family spends one week at his home, Prince Robot IV arrives there to look for the family. When Prince Robot IV sees the manuscript to Heist's next (and last) novel, The Opposite of War, he surmises that it is an allusion to peace, but Heist contends that peace is not the opposite of war, but merely "a lull in the action". Pressed by Robot, Heist asks him about what Robot saw in his visions during the near-death experiences he himself had during battle, which Heist correctly guesses were explicitly sexual. After Robot admits that he saw himself in an orgy with every man and woman he ever fought alongside, he realizes that the opposite of war is sex. Heist is accidentally killed in an ensuing confrontation by Gwendolyn.

After his death, Klara reads another one of his books, despite calling it "juvenile twaddle", because it was the only way she could think to honor the man.

=== Upsher and Doff ===
First appearance: Chapter 13
First named: Chapter 14
Doff killed in: Chapter 51

Upsher and Doff are a tabloid journalist and photographer, respectively, from the planet Jetsam, who work for a tabloid called The Hebdomadal, and who are also lovers, despite the fact that Jetsam, a fledgling planet, suffers from institutionalized homophobia. They first appear in issue #13, alerted to the pairing of Alana and Marko by one of the Landfallian soldiers severely injured by Marko in issue #5. They experience more than one confrontation with Freelancers hired by Special Agent Gale to put an end to their investigation. The Will's sister, a Freelancer named The Brand, poisons them with Embargon, a substance that will kill them if they report their findings about the family to anyone else, though they attempt to find a way around this in order to continue their investigation. After they learn The Brand is dead, they attempt to resume their investigation, but are confronted by The Will, who forces them into his service. They are freed from captivity in Chapter 36, and by Chapter 49, become allied with the family.

Doff is killed by Ianthe in Chapter 51. By Chapter 66, Upsher has taken residence at D. Oswald Heist's lighthouse, which by Upsher has personally rebuilt.

Typical of their species, Upsher and Doff have blue and green skin, respectively, scalloped ears, webbed hands and feet and gills, as theirs is a partially underwater society, being that they are an amphibious species. Their speech, like others from Jetsam, is rendered in the form of blue text surrounded by speech balloons that more closely resemble traditional comics thought bubbles.

=== Missy Heist ===
First mentioned: Chapter 14

D. Oswald Heist's first wife. A blonde cyclops from Cartwright, she was a street musician who played a lute. She was killed by Wreath forces during the siege during the Battle of Cartwright, having gone back home to show off their newborn son to her parents. An errant high-explosive spell hit their house during the first wave. She was the first person Heist ever really loved, and her death hurt him more profoundly than even the death of his son, so much so that he related to Klara that his days following her death were all "kind of shit".

=== Ghüs ===
First appearance: Chapter 12
First named: Chapter 24

Ghüs (pronounced "goose") is a bipedal humanoid resembling a harp seal. He works as a herder on Quietus, near D. Oswald Heist's lighthouse, tending to a herd of four-legged walrus-like animals. One of these animals was Friendo, whom he sold to Klara in exchange for Klara's battle axe, which Ghüs calls a "chopper". Ghüs later regrets selling Friendo, but says he needed a good chopper around the time of year that The Brand visits him in issue 24, due to his area's bone bug problem.

Members of Ghüs' tribe harbor a link to their animals, which allow them to follow one of their herd when it goes missing, "for a little ways, at least", according to Ghüs. Ghüs does not know exactly the range of this ability, but says he once tracked one of his animals "'bout halfway across the tundra." He joins Marko, Prince Robot IV and Yuma in order to use this ability to help find Marko and IV's kidnapped family members after Dengo invades the rocketship treehouse and kidnaps Marko's family.

During the quest, when a guilt-ridden Yuma decries herself as "useless", Ghüs assures her that she is not, and Yuma calls Ghüs "sweet", Ghüs responds that he has been many things in his day, but sweet is not one of them, as he has done a number of things he is not proud of, though he quotes D. Oswald Heist by opining that "a fella is more than their worst three days." When Prince Robot IV suggests blowing Marko and Yuma out an airlock after both of them overdose on Fadeway, Ghüs rejects this course of action, and when IV tries to intimidate Ghüs, Ghüs tells IV that he is not frightened of him, but that Marko scares the life out of him. When the engine room of the dragon skull ship they travel in springs a fuel leak, Ghüs volunteers to repair it, even though he knows that the heat in the engine room will kill him, but he is prevented from doing so by Yuma, who performs this repair herself, and dies in the process.

After reuniting with Friendo, Ghüs helps Prince Robot IV raise his son, Squire on Quietus. While IV goes with Alana and Marko to rescue Hazel and Klara, The Will arrives on Quietus and tries to kill Squire in revenge for the death of The Stalk but Ghüs intervenes. While Ghüs attempts to stop The Will from murdering Squire the Will has Sweet Boy sedate Friendo, which Ghüs interpreted as a poisoning, enraging him and causing him to retaliate by cutting off all the fingers from The Will's right hand. However, Ghüs gets severely injured in the process after The Will strikes Ghüs on the head. The Will then attempts to murder Ghüs but the hallucinations he experiences along with Squire's pleas cause The Will to spare Ghüs.

Ghüs was entirely the creation of Fiona Staples, having appeared among the designs Staples showed to Vaughan in between story arcs. Vaughan has commented, "I knew he'd become a major part of our narrative the second I saw her first sketch of him."

=== Yuma ===
First mentioned: Chapter 15
First named: Chapter 16
First appearance:

(Photograph): Chapter 15
(Live): Chapter 19

Dies in: Chapter 28

Heist's second wife, a painter who does set design for the Open Circuit. According to Heist, she was "certifiably insane" and "could paint like a son of a bitch." Her talents also include hair coloring. At the time that Heist mentioned her to the family, he had not seen her "in ages", he supposed, because she and her crew had to move around a lot to outrun the censors.

After her childhood sweetheart was killed in combat, a grieving Yuma eventually declared herself a "sensualist". Amidst a galaxy of misery, in which she felt young people were too easily convinced to forfeit their lives by dying in the war, the artist dedicated herself to a hedonistic lifestyle, avoiding pain, seeking out pleasure and helping others do the same. She learned to play the Wreath board game Nun Tuj Nun on Gardenia, and later taught it to Heist, which Heist remarked may have been the only positive thing that he took away from that marriage.

Yuma is a humanoid plant creature, with green skin, small, beady black eyes, and a wide nose. She stands with a hunched over posture, has long, thin, spindly green legs without feet that resemble branches, and similar-looking hands. She is covered with a layer of thick green foliage and pink flowers that hangs down her body, resembling a cloak, which can improve the smell of her surroundings.

After Heist's death, the family journeys from Quietus to Gardenia, where Yuma helps Alana get a job as a performer with the Open Circuit, partially on the basis of a recommendation Heist had given her, and becomes a confidant to the family, and the only one Alana allows to see her out of costume. She also gives Marko the blonde hair color he sports while living on that planet.

When the disgruntled Robot custodian Dengo shows up at the OC studio and kills Yuma's coworkers, Yuma tells Dengo about the family and where to find them, and though Dengo shoots her in the abdomen anyway, she survives this. After Dengo takes their families hostage, Yuma teams with Marko, Prince Robot IV and Ghüs to find them.

During a hallucination caused by an overdose on a batch of tainted Fadeaway, she apologizes to Heist for "betraying" him. When the engine room of the dragon skull ship they travel in springs a fuel leak during a battle with Royal Guard forces, Yuma, overcome with guilt over having led Dengo to the family, and decrying herself as "a strung out, backstabbing, useless old cunt", decides to make the repair, even though she knows the heat in the engine room will kill her. She applies a sealant to the leak with a paintbrush, before she is fatally consumed by flames.

=== Rustik ===
First appearance: Chapter 14 (photograph only)
First mentioned by name: Volume 3 trade paperback

Alana's father. His only appearance to date has been a photo of him seen in issue 14. He was not mentioned by name in the original comic, but when that issue was reprinted in the Volume Three trade paperback, an added dialogue balloon indicated his name.

When Fiona Staples first drew Rustik, she envisioned an Indian man.

=== Even ===
First appearance: Chapter 14

Alana's long-time friend and stepmother. They met as children at summer camp. Even met Alana's father after she was out of high school, long after Alana's parents had legally separated. She says that Alana took the marriage "great, all things considered", though a photo from the wedding seen in issue 14 shows Alana looking angered. Although Fiona Staples has rendered Even to be a person of color, much like Alana and Rustik, she did not mention any specific ethnicities she had in mind when doing so.

=== Ginny ===
First appearance: Chapter 19
Killed in: Chapter 62

=== Squire ===
First appearance: Chapter 19
First named in: Chapter 32

Prince Robot IV's young son. He is born in issue 19, though is mother is murdered by Dengo shortly after and he is kidnapped. He is referred to simply as Princeling until he becomes a young boy and is given his new name, following his father's rejection of his royal title.

=== Noreen ===
First appearance: Chapter 31

A yellow insectoid who is responsible for teaching the child prisoners held in the Coalition detention center that Hazel and Klara get sent to at the beginning of volume six. On her fourth birthday, Hazel confides in Noreen that she is half-Landfallian by revealing her wings, though the shock of this causes Noreen to faint and hit her head. Noreen survives her injury and offers to help Hazel escape by exploiting her relationship with one of the guards. When Klara discovers Noreen's plan to smuggle Hazel out, she protests but Noreen convinces her that it will allow her granddaughter to have a better future. Noreen's plan starts to go awry when the guard demands to see what is inside the box she is carrying, prompting her to panic and pretend she had left something in her classroom. The guards begin to get suspicious and start following her but they are interrupted when Marko arrives to rescue his family.

=== Petrichor ===
First appearance: Chapter 31

A transgender prisoner from Wreath being held in a Coalition detention center who is treated as an outcast by the other female prisoners. She happens upon Hazel and an unconscious Noreen and, sympathizing with her, helps Hazel to cover up the incident. When Marko arrives to break his mother and daughter out, Petrichor escapes in Klara's place after she refuses to leave, and reveals to the couple that Alana is pregnant.

=== Bombazine ===
First appearance: Chapter 55

Alana's koala-like business associate who is missing one of his arms, which has been replaced with a prosthetic.

== The family's pursuers and their allies ==
=== Prince Robot IV ===
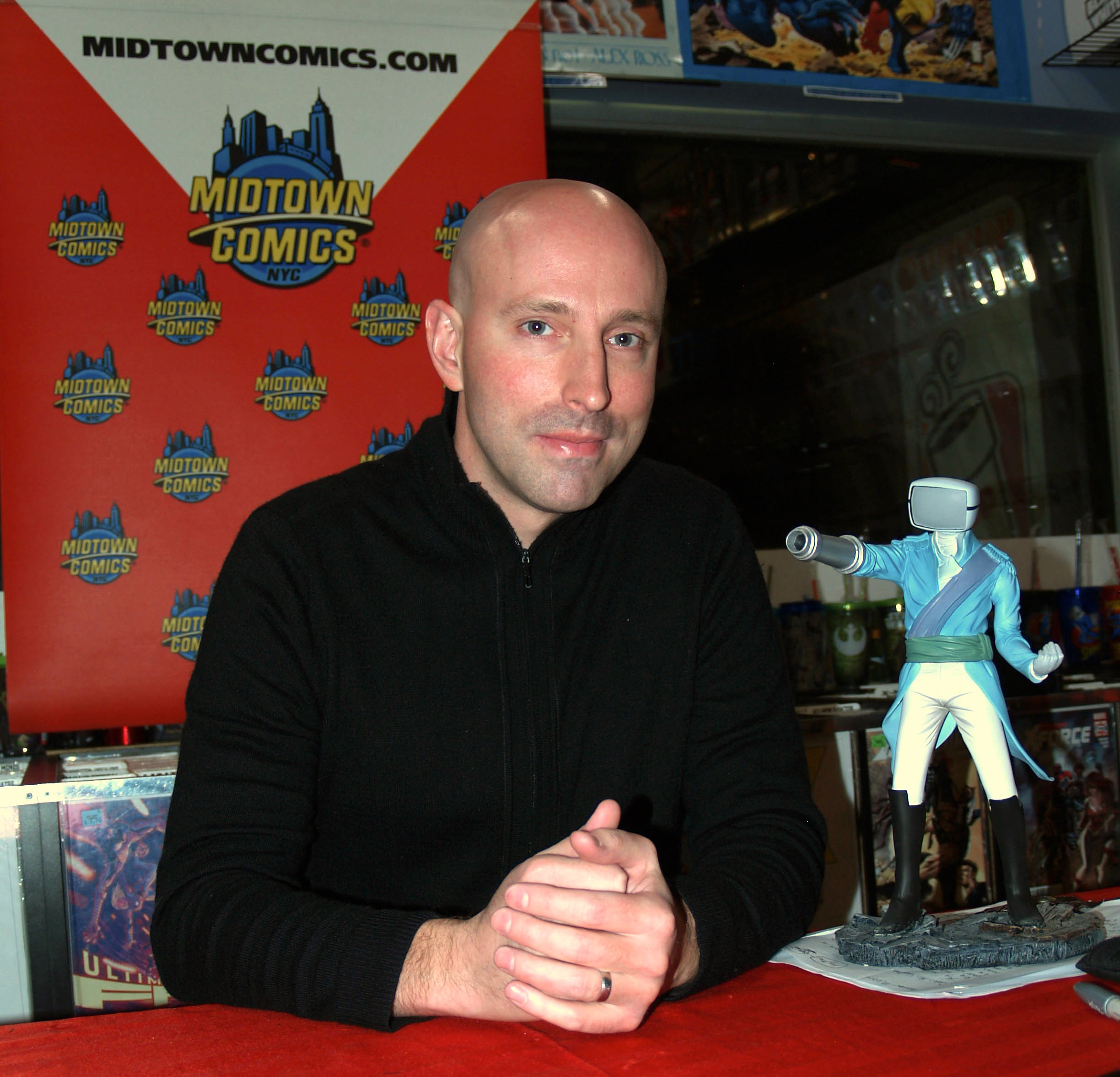
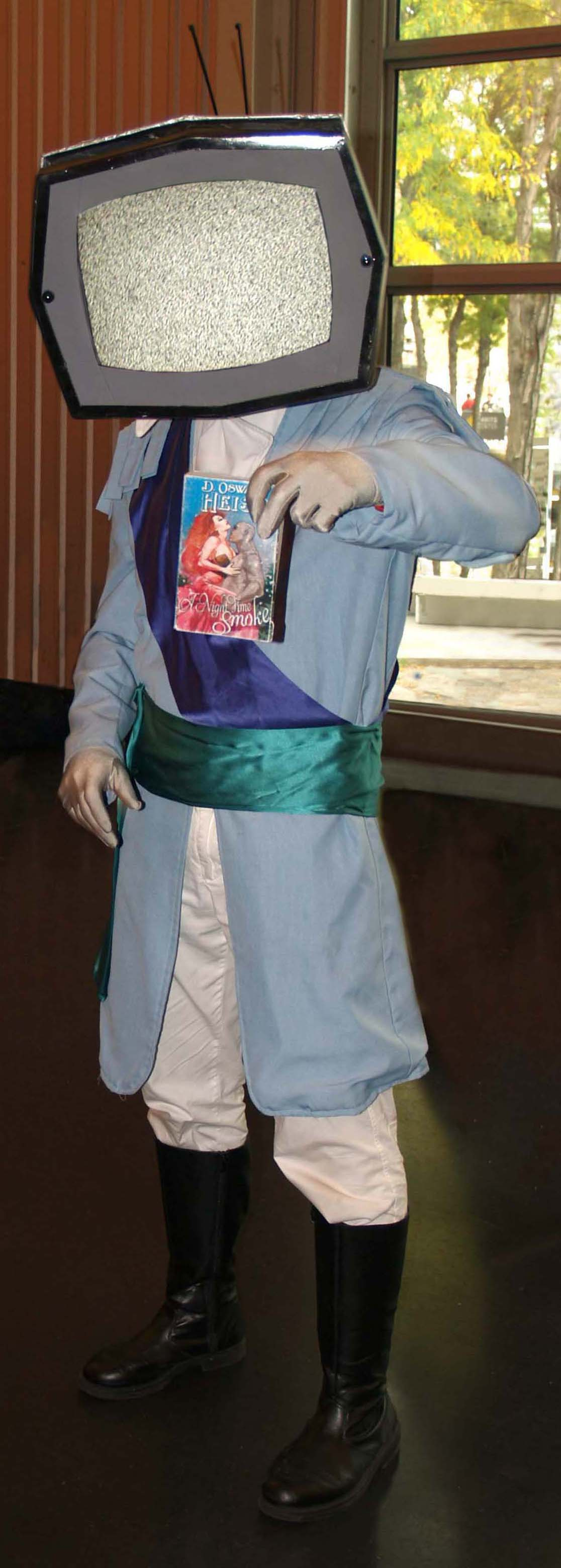
At left, series creator Brian K. Vaughan with a fan-made figurine of Prince Robot IV that was given to him as a gift at a signing at Midtown Comics in Manhattan. At right, a cosplayer dressed as the character at the 2014 New York Comic Con. He is holding a facsimile of A Nighttime Smoke.

First appearance: Chapter 1
Killed in: Chapter 53

A member of the royal family of the Robot Kingdom, employed by Landfall as their primary pursuer of Alana and Marko. Like others of his race, he is a humanoid with a small television set for a head, which Vaughan explains is influenced by a fascination with old televisions that he developed when he began writing for TV. He also has blue blood, and the ability to morph his right arm into a cannon, though its firepower can be adjusted at will to blow a hole through a person's upper torso, or shoot them in the kneecap.

Politically, Vaughan characterizes the Robot Kingdom's alliance with Landfall by saying, "Though it's not exactly analogous, [it is] is almost as weird as the United States' current relationship with Saudi Arabia." A scene in the first issue depicts two of the Robots having sex, which Vaughan says is "actually vitally important to our larger story, so I'm grateful that Fiona was deranged enough to show our bluebloods in their (mostly) anatomically correct splendor."

Prince Robot IV fought at Threshold None, where many soldiers on his side died.

In the beginning of the series, Prince Robot IV has just returned from a "two-year tour of hell", after which he had to be given a new leg following his surviving one of the worst sneak attacks in military history. For this, Prince Robot received a medal the day before being informed that his father has assigned him Alana and Marko. His wife is pregnant with their first child, but he feels he will only be able to witness the birth if he captures Alana in time. After killing a bounty hunter named The Stalk, he confiscates her dragon skull spaceship as his own personal conveyance. His brain "reboots" following an injury he suffers while confronting the family in Volume Three, and convalesces well into Volume Four. While he is away, his wife gives birth to their son, but she is assassinated by a disgruntled janitor named Dengo, who then kidnaps the child. After Dengo journeys to Gardenia and takes the family hostage, Prince Robot IV and Marko team up to go after them. Prince Robot kills Dengo and is united with his son at the end of Volume 5.

Andy Hunsaker attributes much of the success of Saga to Prince Robot IV, stating that Brian K. Vaughan's serious treatment of a character with an otherwise absurd visual design that others might have played for laughs elevates the character and engages the reader in a profound way.

=== Special Agent Gale ===
First appearance: Chapter 1

The agent from Landfall's from Secret Intelligence to whom Prince Robot IV answers. He overlapped with Alana for six months of basic training. After he learns that two journalists, Upsher and Doff, are investigating Alana's story, he seeks out freelance assassins to put a stop to their investigation.

=== The Will ===
First appearance: Chapter 1

Wreath's primary pursuer of the two fugitives, The Will is one of the freelance bounty hunters hired by the Wreath High Command through the Brio Talent Agency to kill Marko and Alana, not only for Marko's betrayal, but also so that news of the coupling does not spread and threaten troop morale. Vez, the woman who hires him, also instructs him to bring back Hazel alive and unharmed to receive his full fee. The Will is accompanied by a Lying Cat, a large talking female feline that can detect lies. Vez says she hired The Will because he shares Marko's moral relativism. The Will's moral outlook is such that after telling a pimp on the sexually permissive planet Sextillion that the activity he has seen on Sextillion seems rather tame, and being presented by the pimp with a six-year-old sexual slave girl, The Will kills the pimp. He renames the slave girl Sophie, and she becomes his companion.

The Will was once the lover of The Stalk, a female spider-like bounty hunter who is also assigned to Alana and Marko, until she is killed by Prince Robot IV, for which The Will vows revenge. After Marko's ex-fiancée Gwendolyn joins his hunt, The Will develops an attraction to her, even as he mourns The Stalk. His sister Sophie, who addresses him "Billy", and who introduced him to The Stalk, is another Freelancer who works under the name The Brand. In Volume Three, he decides to abandon his Freelancer life, but suffers a near fatal stab wound to his throat. Although he is brought to a hospital in time to save him, it is said that he will likely never fully recover from the trauma. After Gwendolyn, Sophie, and the Brand go on a quest to procure an elixir to heal his injuries, The Will recovers, but when he hears that his sister was killed during their quest, the grief-stricken Freelancer is so outraged that he excoriates his two benefactors and banishes them from his bedside. He and Gwendolyn become lovers in Chapter 55, and they appear to be a couple in Chapter 67, in which he declares that he loves her.

=== Lying Cat ===
First appearance: Chapter 1

Lying Cat is a large, female talking feline companion to The Will who aids him in his work. Green in color with yellow stripes, she has the ability to detect when a verbal statement is a lie, which she indicates by saying, "Lying". Her power is limited to the state of the mind of the person speaking: She can detect deliberate deception, but cannot detect a falsehood if a given statement is believed to be true by the speaker. According to Izabel, Lying Cats always play by the rules, an allusion to the fact that a Lying Cat must also admit ethical truths as well as factual ones. When Gwendolyn, who becomes Lying Cat's ally, accidentally kills a man, Izabel says that they had no right to execute that man in his home, which Lying Cat could not deny. Lying Cat was the runt of her seven-kitten litter, a truth that has caused her distress.

A line of T-shirts featuring Lying Cat have been produced, and have become visible in popular media. In "Pac-Man Fever", the April 24, 2013 episode of the American TV series Supernatural, the character Charlie Bradbury (played by Felicia Day) is seen wearing a Lying Cat T-shirt. Day, who has referred to Saga as the "best comic EVER", indicated that show writer Robbie Thompson picked out the shirt. Skybound Entertainment has also produced an 8" tall resin statue of the character, and a posable, 19-inch tall plushy doll of it that says, "Lying" when its collar is pressed.

=== Vez ===
First appearance: Chapter 1

Secretary General of Wreath High Command, who hires the Will to go after Alana and Marko. She is later contacted by the Fourth Cell of the Last Revolution, who agree to trade Hazel for hundreds of their imprisoned cell members, but when she sees that the Fourth Cell has allied themselves with Dengo, a Robot, Vez, who regards Robots as soulless death machines, is so outraged that she refuses to deal further with the Fourth Cell, spurring Quain, the Fourth Cell's leader, to threaten to kill Dengo, and resulting in his own death at Dengo's hands.

In Chapter 55, three years after murdering Marko, The Will finally returns to Wreath High Command with Marko's skull, but finds that Vez has died months prior, and her position now occupied by Gwendolyn.

=== The Stalk ===
First appearance: Chapter 2
Killed in: Chapter 5

The Stalk is a female bounty hunter, who like The Will, has been assigned by the Brio Talent Agency to capture Alana and Marko. She appears as an armless, topless blonde woman with the lower body of a spider.

Hailing from the planet Demimonde, The Stalk was once the lover of The Will, after The Will's sister, The Brand, introduced the two of them.

She is killed by Prince Robot IV, for which The Will vows revenge. He experiences visions/hallucinations of her after her death, even as he develops an attraction to Gwendolyn.

=== The Brand ===
First appearance: Chapter 17

Killed in: Chapter 29

The Brand is the "working name" of The Will's sister, Sophie, who also operates as a Freelancer.

She first appears in issue 17, where she poisons Upsher and Doff with Embargon, a substance that will kill them if they report their findings about Alana and her family to anyone else. The Brand says she did not kill them because Upsher and Doff were pretty fair to the Freelancer union when they reported on their last strike. The Brand joins Gwendolyn and Sophie's mission to find Formula 9766 in order to heal The Will in Volume Four, which is the first time The Brand has seen Lying Cat since the latter was a kitten. She is killed while defending Sophie from a dragon. Following her death, The Brand appears as part of The Will's hallucinations, often as a counterpoint to his hallucinations of The Stalk.

The Brand dresses in a suit and tie and trench coat. She is accompanied by a red and black Saint Bernard-like dog named Sweet Boy who can shoot darts filled with different substances out of his nostrils. These include green tranquilizers darts or yellow ones that contain Embargon. Sweet Boy carries what looks like a brandy flask around his neck with a skull-and-crossbones on it. The Brand uses a crash helm in conjunction with a handheld knife to open teleportational portals. Though crash helms are typically worn only by Wreathers, she learned how to use one after studying for a few years in graduate school on Wreath before joining the Freelancers.

=== Gwendolyn ===
First mentioned: Chapter 3
First appearance: Chapter 8

Marko's former fiancée. Described by Time magazine's Douglas Wolk as "a dead ringer for Coffy-era Pam Grier", she is first mentioned by a semi-conscious Marko at the end of issue #3. Marko and Alana's wedding rings, which also function as translator devices, were originally those of Gwendolyn's grandparents, who had the rings enchanted with a translator spell because they spoke two different dialects of Wreath's native language.

Gwendolyn first appears at the end of issue #8, having been assigned by the Secretary General of Wreath High Command to check on The Will, and helps him rescue Sophie ("Slave Girl") from Sextillion in order to spur him to complete his mission. She wears her grandparents' translation pendant around her neck, which were forged with the rings as part of the same set. By Volume Four, she has taken on Sophie as her duly sanctioned Page, as the two seek to acquire Formula 9766 an elixir to heal The Will.

Gwendolyn is a civilian whose father is a vice minister, a status with which she was able to wrangle a deferment from serving in the war. She and Marko got engaged when they were in what the Landfallians would call high school, and planned to marry after Marko got back from the war. However, they grew apart, on account of the misgivings that Marko developed after he saw battle, and he realized it would never work between them. During his engagement to her, Klara characterized her as a "worthless draft dodger", though Klara later regretted their breakup.

The person who took Gwendolyn's virginity is a white-haired Wreathan woman with a single unicorn-like horn named Velour, a nude image of which appears to her when Gwen comes under the spell of the hallucinogenic fruit on the planet in issue #16. When The Will kisses Gwendolyn without any prompting by her, she gives him a bloody lip, and warns him never to do this again. She later clarifies to him that she has had relations with people of other races, including races like his, but did not wish to do so with him. Despite this, she reveals she loves him while attempting get medical attention for him following his stabbing by Sophie. They become lovers in Chapter 55, and they appear to be a couple in Chapter 67, in which he declares that he loves her.

Gwendolyn initially carries a staff with a tassel on its upper half, with which she is skilled in battle. In addition to this, she later carries The Will's lance, beginning in Volume Four. Though her initial control of the lance is so poor that she accidentally kills D. Oswald Heist with it, her skill with it eventually improves by Chapter 24 that she is able to use it adeptly in battle.

=== Sophie ===
First appearance: Chapter 4
First given the name Sophie: Chapter 13
Killed in: Chapter 65

A former sex slave, initially known only as Slave Girl, whom The Will discovers on the pleasure planet Sextillion.

Sophie is originally from the comet Phang. The Wreathers arrested her brother on the charge of aiding the Landfallians, of which Sophie says he is innocent. Her uncle had to pay a fine to secure his release, and because he did not have enough money, and Sophie was too small to work in the mines, he sold Sophie, after being told that she would be given a job cleaning homes. The Will and Gwendolyn rescue her, after which Sophie reveals she possesses the power of psychometry, with which she helps The Will track Marko and Alana. The Will decides to name her Sophie in issue #13, which is the same name as his sister.

Sophie is six years old in Volume One, and has grown considerably by Volume Four, which is set in the year after she has become Gwendolyn's duly sanctioned Page, which gives Sophie the legal right to follow Gwen anywhere, including a theater of war. The two of them seek to acquire ingredients for Formula 9766, in order to heal The Will.

In Chapter 65, Sophie is killed when she attempts to block arrow fired by Petrichor at The Will, which is laced with a poison for which there is no cure.

Vaughan revealed that Sophie, whose first appearance Staples initially refused to draw, was created to illustrate the horrific effects of war, and as a critique of the sexualized portrayal of Princess Leia as Jabba the Hutt's slave in the film Star Wars: Return of the Jedi, explaining, "That's that character at her least sexy. There are slave girls in the world and they don't look like Princess Leia in a bikini."

=== Dengo ===
First appearance: Chapter 19
Killed in: Chapter 30

Dengo is a Robot from a poor village who has an old cathode ray tube television set for a head. He first appears in issue 19, having worked as a custodian for Prince Robot IV and his wife for two years at that point. He assassinates Prince Robot IV's wife, Princess Robot, and kidnaps their son, because his own son, Jokum, died at the age of four from diarrhea after drinking the water for their village's stream, because they were commoners and lacked medical insurance, a common occurrence in their region. He and the infant subsequently journey to Gardenia, where he takes the family hostage. Upon finding Dengo and those he kidnapped, Robot IV kills Dengo in Chapter 30.

=== Ianthe ===
First appearance: Chapter 42

Ianthe is a star-nosed mole-like humanoid woman who often wears a pointed diamond mask to hide her identity. She first appears in issue 42, when she kills Sweet Boy and shoots The Will in the stomach before kidnapping him and taking him aboard her floating jellyfish spaceship. Eventually, Ianthe reveals to The Will that she is a diplomat and the fiancée of a man named Hektor, a Sextillion security agent who was murdered when The Will rescued Sophie in Chapter 9, and uses a mind-scanning device on him to identify his loved ones so that she can have her revenge by murdering them. Upon finding out about Alana and Marko however, Ianthe decides to pursue them instead for monetary gain and forces The Will to co-operate. Eventually, she tracks them to Jetsam and finds Doff, who she kills after he refuses to give up the family. In the battle, The Will escapes and leaves Ianthe a note, advising her that they are even following her murder of Sweet Boy and advising her to abandon her pursuit. Ianthe subsequently finds Squire alone in the woods and takes him hostage. When Alana attacks her from midair, Ianthe manages to destroy one of her wings before being shot by Upsher as revenge for Doff's murder. Upsher is ultimately revealed to have spared and subsequently rehabilitated her, leading her to live with him and Ghüs in Heist's old lighthouse.

== Character lifespans ==
The following table graphically shows each recurring character's status in each volume of the comic sorted by which volume they first appeared; a character marked as absent in one volume may appear in a later volume.

Volumes the character is alive and present
Volume in which the character dies
Volumes in which the character is deceased
Volumes prior to the character's birth
Volumes in which the character is alive but does not appear (as of the current issue)

=== Volume 1–12 ===
Character	Volume											
Character	1	2	3	4	5	6	7	8	9	10	11	12
Alana												
Marko												
Hazel												
Prince Robot IV												
Princess Robot												
Special Agent Gale												
The Will (Billy)												
Lying Cat												
Vez												
The Stalk												
Izabel												
Sophie												
Mama Sun												
Barr												
Klara												
Gwendolyn												
Ghüs												
Oswald Heist												
The March												
Upsher												
Doff												
Countess Robot X												
The Brand												
Sweet Boy												
Squire												
Dengo												
Ginny												
Yuma												
King Robot												
Lexis												
Noreen												
Petrichor												
Ianthe												
Bombazine												
Skipper												
Dranken												
Marquess II												
Vitch												
Whist												
Feld												
Emesis												

== See also ==
- List of Saga story arcs
