= List of Saga story arcs =

Featured here is a chronological (by publication) list of story arcs in the epic space opera/fantasy comic book series Saga, which is created by writer Brian K. Vaughan and artist Fiona Staples. Saga premiered in March 2012, and is published monthly by Image Comics.

Each issue of Saga is titled with a numerical Chapter, such as "Chapter 1" for the debut issue. Every six chapters comprise a story arc designated as a "Volume" and are reprinted as trade paperbacks. Every three Volumes comprise a "Book" and are collected as hardcover editions. According to Vaughan, the series will span 108 issues, or chapters.

== Book One ==
=== Volume One ===
The first trade paperback collection, Saga, Vol. 1, which collects the first six issues, was published October 10, 2012, and appeared at Number 6 on the New York Times Graphic Books Best Seller list the week of October 29.

Title	Issue #	Release date
"Chapter One"	1	March 14, 2012
On a planet called Cleave, Alana gives birth to their daughter, Hazel, while she and Marko flee soldiers from her people and his. Prince Robot IV and The Will are assigned to go after them.
"Chapter Two"	2	April 11, 2012
Alana, Marko and Hazel make their way through the Endless Woods. The Will learns the identity of another freelancer on the hunt. Prince Robot IV arrives on Cleave to investigate.
"Chapter Three"	3	May 16, 2012
After The Stalk's attack, Alana meets the feared "Horrors" of Cleave and is forced to consider a deal with one of them, Izabel, to save Marko. Prince Robot IV interrogates a prisoner.
"Chapter Four"	4	June 20, 2012
Izabel uses magic to heal Marko while Alana doubts her marriage and relationship. Seeking a respite, The Will investigates the pleasures of Sextillion.
"Chapter Five"	5	July 18, 2012
Alana and Marko are confronted by a group of Landfallian soldiers. Meanwhile, The Will deals with the consequences of rescuing a six-year-old sex slave from Sextillion named Slave Girl.
"Chapter Six"	6	August 15, 2012
Prince Robot IV and The Will's paths intersect. Meanwhile, Alana and Marko make it to the Rocketship Forest, where they use an organic, tree-like rocket to leave Cleave, before being confronted by Marko's parents.

=== Volume Two ===
The second trade paperback collection, Saga, Vol. 2, which collects issues #7-12, was released June 19, 2013.

Title	Issue #	Release date
"Chapter Seven"	7	November 14, 2012
A flashback depicts how Marko was taught the history of his people's conflict with Landfall. In the present, Marko and his mother, Klara, go searching for Izabel, while Alana gets to know Barr, Marko's father, who reveals he has one month left to live.
"Chapter Eight"	8	December 19, 2012
Alana and Marko's first meeting is shown in flashback. In the present, Barr asks Alana to conceal his illness from Klara and Marko. Meanwhile, while searching for Izabel in the Shadow City, Marko and Klara confront the giant, Fard, who tells them the planetoid they are on is a soon-to-hatch egg. Marko's ex-fiancée, Gwendolyn, makes an appearance at the Brio Talent Agency.
"Chapter Nine"	9	January 16, 2013
Gwendolyn confronts The Will over his incomplete mission. To spur him to expedite it, she helps him rescue Slave Girl from Sextillion, after which Slave Girl reveals the psychometric ability to track Marko and Alana through their wedding rings, which were part of the same set as Gwendolyn's translation pendant.
"Chapter Ten"	10	February 20, 2013
Alana's release of Marko from prison and their initial romance is depicted in flashback. In the present, Marko, Klara and Izabel return to the ship, after which the family is confronted by both The Will and the hatching of the giant egg.
"Chapter Eleven"	11	March 20, 2013
Both Alana and Marko's ship and The Will are caught in the pull of the newly hatched giant space fetus known as a Timesuck. Marko's father, Barr, casts a spell to aid in the rocketship's escape, the strain of which kills him.
"Chapter Twelve"	12	April 10, 2013
Prince Robot IV's pursuit of Alana and Marko leads him to the home of D. Oswald Heist, author of Alana's favorite novel. A discussion of the war gets heated and leads to hostilities, with Prince Robot unaware that his targets are hiding in Heist's home.

=== Volume Three ===
The third trade paperback collection, Saga, Vol. 3, which collects issues #13–18, was released March 19, 2014.

Title	Issue #	Release date
"Chapter Thirteen"	13	August 14, 2013
In flashback, the family, weeks after Barr's death, arrive on Quietus and meet Heist, whom Alana hopes can advise them on their future. Upsher and Doff, a tabloid journalist and photographer, interview one of the Landfallian soldiers injured by Marko during the unsuccessful attempt to capture the family in Chapter Five. Meanwhile, The Will, Gwendolyn and Slave Girl are stranded on a planet awaiting repairs to their ship. The Will must deal with the sexual tension between himself and Gwendolyn, and decides to name Slave Girl Sophie.
"Chapter Fourteen"	14	September 25, 2013
Upsher and Doff interview Alana's stepmother, Even. On Quietus, the family and Heist get to know one another. The Will decides to quit his pursuit of the family, but tells Gwendolyn that he will pass along any leads that his informants give to him to her. When he tries to kiss Gwendolyn, she rebuffs him, but the image of the Stalk tells him that she is not entirely uninterested in him. The Will is contacted by an informant at a refueling station who informs him that Prince Robot IV is refueling his ship there and asked for directions to Quietus.
"Chapter Fifteen"	15	October 30, 2013
Continuing their investigation on the planet Mota, Upsher and Doff are targeted by a sniper. On Quietus, Marko and Alana clash over plans for their future. Meanwhile, the Will's spaceship is repaired, but he is seriously wounded by a hallucinating Sophie.
"Chapter Sixteen"	16	November 27, 2013
Upsher and Doff question Special Agent Gale about Alana and Marko, but Gale attempts to dissuade them from continuing their investigation by telling them that Alana is a deep cover agent, and later contacts the Brio Talent Agency to have them assassinated. Gwendolyn discovers the hallucinogenic nature of the flora and fauna of the planet on which The Will set down his ship, and manages to prevent Sophie from killing him, but to save him, she takes him to Quietus, arriving at the same time that Prince Robot IV does.
"Chapter Seventeen"	17	December 18, 2013
Upsher and Doff are poisoned by a Freelancer named The Brand, with a substance that will kill them if they report their findings about Alana and her family to anyone else. On Quietus, The Will's vital signs fade as Prince Robot IV threatens to kill Heist, and their talk of the Prince's near-death experiences provides insight into Heist's next novel and his views on war. Klara and Gwendolyn then intervene, and as a result, the Prince is rendered unconscious and Heist is killed.
"Chapter Eighteen"	18	January 29, 2014
As Izabel uses her illusions and a malfunctioning Prince Robot IV to save Klara, Gwendolyn confronts Alana and Marko, who escape her, in part with help from Alana's newly discovered power of flight. Upsher and Doff find a way to continue their investigation without triggering the poison in their system. After Gwendolyn takes The Will (about whom she reveals her feelings) to a hospital mentioned by Alana, he is visited by The Brand, who is revealed to be his sister, Sophie. The story jumps ahead to Hazel taking her first steps as the rocketship touches down on the family's newest refuge.

== Book Two ==
=== Volume Four ===
The fourth trade paperback collection, Saga, Vol. 4, which collects issues #19-24, was released on December 17, 2014, the same day as Saga Deluxe Edition volume 1, a hardcover that reprints the first 18 issues, or Book One of the series, comprising its first three-story arcs.

Title	Issue #	Release date
"Chapter Nineteen"	19	May 21, 2014
The family has been living on the planet Gardenia for several months. Alana is struggling as an actor on the Open Circuit, an underground acting troupe in which all the players wear masks. While caring for Hazel, who is now saying simple phrases, Marko meets a children's dance studio owner named Ginny. Prince Robot IV's son is born, although he himself is still missing in action. Alana and Marko disagree over balancing keeping a low profile with giving Hazel a happy childhood.
"Chapter Twenty"	20	June 25, 2014
Prince Robot IV recuperates on Sextillion. Alana tries a drug called Fadeaway after learning that half her colleagues are high on it. Marko becomes closer to Ginny, the children's dance studio owner he met in the park. Robot IV's wife and her staff are assassinated by her custodian, Dengo, whose son died at age four due to lack of medical insurance available to commoners.
"Chapter Twenty-One"	21	July 23, 2014
Alana continues to experiment with Fadeway, while Marko and Ginny are brought closer by the time they spend away from their spouses. Dengo, with the infant Robot as his hostage, invades a Landfallian starship and kills its crew. Robot IV comes out of his stupor and after learning what has happened to his wife and son during his three-week convalescence, resolves to ask his father, King Robot, for assistance.
"Chapter Twenty-Two"	22	August 27, 2014
Yuma cautions Alana to maintain her cover, but Alana's actions may have alerted Upsher to her whereabouts. When Marko discovers her drug use, and Alana confronts him over Ginny, the ensuing argument becomes physical, and leads to Marko's estrangement from their home. Prince Robot IV's father, King Robot, declines his request to take the lead in pursuing Dengo, but Special Agent Gale gives the Prince a lead that may prove useful. Dengo arrives at The Open Circuit Productions facility and demands airtime on which to broadcast a speech to the masses, and after he kills two of Alana's colleagues, Yuma says she can give him something better than airtime.
"Chapter Twenty-Three"	23	September 24, 2014
Marko heads to Ginny's house, but abruptly has a change of heart and leaves to return home. Prince Robot IV pursues Dengo, and finds the wreckage of the ship Dengo hijacked, and its occupants dead, along with a clue to his son's survival. Yuma tells Dengo about the family and where to find them, after which Dengo shoots her. Izabel counsels Alana on the need for forgiveness. Dengo invades the treehouse rocketship with the infant in tow, and although Alana launches the rocketship, he takes Klara hostage and demands Alana take the ship to coordinates of his choice. Marko arrives home just after the launch of the ship, at which point he is met by both the wounded Yuma and Prince Robot IV.
"Chapter Twenty-Four"	24	October 29, 2014
Gwendolyn and Sophie, who is now Gwendolyn's duly sanctioned Page, meet The Will's sister, The Brand, who offers to aid them in their endeavor to acquire an elixir to heal The Will. Marko, Prince Robot IV and Yuma team up to seek the aid of Heist's neighbor, Ghüs, to use his link to Friendo to track their families.

=== Volume Five ===
Title	Issue #	Release date
"Chapter Twenty-Five"	25	February 4, 2015
Three months after leaving Gardenia, Dengo and the captive family have set down on an unnamed planet of ice in the Solar Graveyard, where Dengo meets with revolutionaries in the hope of punishing the Robots for their participation in the war. Meanwhile, as they are led through space in The Stalk's dragon skull ship by Ghüs, Marko and Prince Robot IV struggle to maintain their alliance amid personal conflicts. Gwendolyn, Sophie and The Brand must contend with a family of giant dragons in their search for ingredients for the elixir. In narration, the adult Hazel reveals that it will be years before she and her father see each other again.
"Chapter Twenty-Six"	26	March 4, 2015
Dengo and his captives meet a group of rebels called The Last Revolution, but Alana and Klara warn Dengo that they are terrorists. Gwen, Sophie and The Brand contend with a herd of female dragons, and learn they need a rare male dragon to complete their quest. After foiling an armed robbery by a fellow veteran in possession of the drug Fadeaway, Marko learns more about what lured Alana to the drug, and decides to try it himself.
"Chapter Twenty-Seven"	27	April 8, 2015
As Prince Robot IV and Ghüs deal with Marko and Yuma's overdose on a batch of bad Fadeway, Marko experiences a childhood flashback that clarifies his sense of himself and strengthens his resolve to find his family and kill Dengo.
"Chapter Twenty-Eight"	28	May 13, 2015
On Demimonde, The Stalk's older brother, Halvor, confronts Gwendolyn, Sophie and The Brand. Alana pleads with an ambivalent Dengo to confront Quain, the leader of the Fourth Cell of the Last Revolution, who plans to trade Hazel in exchange for the release of one thousand of his comrades from prison. Marko, the Prince and their allies find themselves in battle against an immense Royal Guard starship sent by IV's father to capture them. During the battle, their dragon skull ship's engine room springs a fuel leak, and Yuma sacrifices her life to seal it.
"Chapter Twenty-Nine"	29	June 10, 2015
Quain arranges to trade Hazel in exchange for a prisoner release from Wreath, but Vez's reaction to the presence of Dengo leads to a shift in loyalties for the Robot, who kills Quain. Prince Robot IV and Marko narrowly escape the Royal Guard ship, but teleport into an ice storm, which results in an explosion that seriously injuries IV, and hurtles the dragon skull into an uncontrolled fall toward a planet. On Demimonde, Gwendolyn, Sophie and The Brand find a male dragon, but their attempt to procure its seed results in The Brand's death and a serious injury to Gwendolyn.
"Chapter Thirty"	30	July 8, 2015
After Dengo and Alana kill Sirge, Lexis and Zizz leave the planet with Klara and Hazel. Marko and Prince Robot IV encounter Alana and Dengo, upon which IV kills Dengo, and is reunited with his infant son. Gwendolyn and Sophie manage to revive The Will with the elixir, but when he finds out that his sister, The Brand was killed in their quest, the grief-stricken mercenary is so outraged that he excoriates his two benefactors and banishes them from his bedside. Hazel is revealed to have been placed in a Landfallian detention center with Wreather children.

=== Volume Six ===
Title	Issue #	Release date
"Chapter Thirty-One"	31	November 25, 2015
Continuing from the previous issue, the Last Revolution's ship is captured by the Robot Kingdom's Royal Guard. Zizz is killed by Klara, and she, Hazel and Lexis are captured. After claiming to be civilians previously forced into slave labor, they are relegated to a Coalition detention center for enemy non-combatants. Izabel also reappears, now that Hazel is on a planet that experiences nightfall. Years later, Hazel is one of the pupils of a sympathetic teacher named Noreen. She also befriends a transgender Wreather prisoner named Petrichor who is treated as an outcast by the other female prisoners. On her fourth birthday, Hazel confides in Noreen that she is half Landfallian by showing Noreen her wings, but this causes Noreen to faint, and seriously injure her head.
"Chapter Thirty-Two"	32	December 23, 2015
Alana and Marko manage to retrieve valuable information on the planet Variegate which reveals that Hazel and Klara were taken to a detention center on Landfall. On a "pocket world", Ghüs crosses paths with Robot IV, who, after falling out of favor with his father, has lost his status as a prince, and now answers to Sir Robot. Ghüs informs IV of the arrival of Marko and Alana, but IV refuses to meet with them, preferring to focus on the care of his son, Squire, who is now a young boy.
"Chapter Thirty-Three"	33	January 27, 2016
When Upsher and Doff learn of The Brand's death, they decide to resume their investigation of Alana and Marko. The pair track down Ginny on Gardenia, who tells them of her brief friendship with Marko. Their continuing search leads them to the ice planet in the Solar Graveyard where Marko and the former Prince Robot IV crash landed in the previous story arc. Upon their arrival, they are confronted by a now-obese The Will, who with the aid of Sweet Boy incapacitates the couple and informs them that they are now working for him in his quest for revenge against Sir Robot.
"Chapter Thirty-Four"	34	February 24, 2016
Petrichor happens upon Hazel and the unconscious Noreen, learning Hazel's secret. Sympathizing with Hazel as a fellow outcast, she helps Hazel cover up the incident. Marko and Alana blackmail Sir Robot into helping them find Hazel. Doff agrees to give The Will the coordinates of the planet where he believes Sir Robot is hiding, on condition that he release them if the information is true. Noreen survives her injury, and after Hazel confides in her further, she offers to help Hazel escape.
"Chapter Thirty-Five"	35	March 30, 2016
Klara protests when she learns of Noreen's plan to smuggle Hazel out of the prison, prompting Noreen to plead with her to ensure a better future for her granddaughter. Alana, Marko, and Sir Robot's plan to infiltrate the prison by having IV pose as a visiting royal is complicated when the rocketship finds itself in a minefield. After being tipped off by an informant, Upsher and Doff lead The Will to Robot IV's secret hideout planet, where he threatens Squire, leading to a standoff with Ghüs.
"Chapter Thirty-Six"	36	April 27, 2016
On the pocket world, Ghüs and The Will have a brief altercation, in which The Will's right fingers are severed. As Upsher and Doff escape his ship, The Will is dissuaded from killing Squire and Ghüs by a hallucination of The Brand, who tells him that The Stalk was merely an obsession of his, not his true love, and that he should seek direction from "the one chick who calls [him] on [his] bullshit." Marko rescues Hazel from the detention center, but Klara, having developed a place among the prisoners' community, and refusing to be a burden to the couple, declines to leave, telling Marko how proud she is of him. Petrichor, however, escapes with Marko, and reveals to the couple that Alana is pregnant.

== Book Three ==
=== Volume Seven: "The War for Phang" ===
Title	Issue #	Release date
"Chapter Thirty-Seven"	37	August 31, 2016
As the family readjusts to life following their reunion, Alana and Marko discuss when to tell Hazel about Alana's pregnancy. Sir Robot IV is dismayed to realize that he is having sexual dreams about Alana. Petrichor and Izabel find a common interest. On Wreath, Sophie implores Gwendolyn to allow her to train as a Freelancer so she can finish what The Will started, but Gwendolyn has moved on from that matter, and warns Sophie, who is from the war-torn comet Phang, that any relatives of hers still there need to be evacuated immediately. Meanwhile, dwindling fuel forces the family to land on Phang themselves, where they encounter a family of starving meerkat-like people.
"Chapter Thirty-Eight"	38	September 28, 2016
The family has been staying on Phang for six months alongside the tribe of meerkat-like locals they encountered upon landing, with Alana acting as a den mother. Marko and Petrichor observe the ongoing war on the comet from a safe distance. Hazel rebels against Izabel, prompting her to offer Sir Robot IV help in leaving Phang to reunite with Squire. On Wreath, The Will seeks Gwendolyn but instead meets her wife, Velour. Izabel heads to an abandoned Robot embassy where she comes across a two-headed Freelancer known as The March whose weapons can affect her. When she refuses to reveal the whereabouts of the family, The March stabs her, causing Izabel to disappear, resulting in Hazel experiencing a deep pain.
"Chapter Thirty-Nine"	39	October 26, 2016
Hazel expresses her distress to the family when she insists that she can no longer feel Izabel's presence. After a brief argument between Marko and Sir Robot IV, Petrichor volunteers to track down Izabel. On Wreath, The Will receives news from his handler that the Freelancer agency is closing down and that his license to kill as an assassin has been revoked. A conversation with Kurti leads Hazel to experience her first kiss. The March encounters the dying corpse of a Robot ambassador while exploring the embassy and discovers cryptic information regarding the fates of all the inhabitants on Phang.
"Chapter Forty"	40	November 30, 2016
Hazel and Kurti share a conversation while viewing the dreams of Sir Robot IV. Marko questions the sudden retreat of Wreath military forces and briefly lashes out at Jabarah over her insistence to use weapons during an eventual conflict. The March gets visual confirmation of Marko's whereabouts. Gwendolyn has a clandestine meeting with Special Agent Gale from Landfall and presents him with a mysterious gold box. The two engage in a heated discussion over the fate of Phang as Sophie eavesdrops on them. Petrichor encounters a bluecap in the form of a giant mushroom, who tells her that Phang is deserted because it is heading toward a Timesuck. After having his sleep disturbed earlier by Kurti and Hazel, IV samples some Fadeaway and confronts Alana, where in his drugged state, he admits the reason for his attraction to Alana before transforming his arm into a cannon and pointing it at his head.
"Chapter Forty-One"	41	January 4, 2017
Petrichor warns Jabarah of Phang's imminent collision with the Timesuck. During the standoff with the drugged Robot IV, Marko and Robot IV are knocked unconscious. The March arrives outside the family's treehouse and holds Kurti hostage. On Wreath, Gwendolyn, Sophie, and Lying Cat reunite with The Will and Sweet Boy, where The Will offers Sophie the chance to become a Freelancer. Sophie and Lying Cat decide to remain with Gwendolyn, after which The Will and Sweet Boy depart. On Phang, Hazel uses magic to create a distraction that allows Kurti to escape before Marko kills The March.
"Chapter Forty-Two"	42	January 25, 2017
On Wreath, Gwendolyn instructs Sophie to keep the information she knows about Landfall and Wreath secret from Velour. On Phang, Sir Robot IV is kept bound by Marko while Petrichor manages to procure enough fuel to launch the treehouse rocketship off the comet. Jabarah refuses to leave with the family, believing the creator will protect her and her tribe. Elsewhere, The Will is confronted by a masked female named Ianthe, who kills Sweet Boy and shoots The Will in the stomach, telling him that he murdered someone Ianthe loved. A rogue spaceship piloted by the Landfallian henchmen of Special Agent Gale shoots down a nearby Robot-controlled vessel and activates the gold box Gwendolyn gave to them. The device releases an energy force that causes the Timesuck to expel a torrent of black liquid that begins to engulf Phang. In the ensuing chaos, Petrichor launches the treehouse out of danger but causes Alana to experience a fall that results in a miscarriage. Kurti and the other citizens of Phang are consumed in the Timesuck's deluge.

=== Volume Eight: "The Coffin" ===
Title	Issue #	Release date
"Chapter Forty-Three"	43	May 31, 2017
Following the destruction of Phang and prompted by Alana's miscarriage, the family heads to an outpost planet at the westernmost edge of the universe called Pervious, which is controlled by Landfall. Posing as a couple, Alana and Sir Robot IV encounter the Doctor Sherriff of the planet's Abortion Town, who informs them that she cannot perform a late-term abortion on Alana due to Landfallian laws, but directs them to an illegal part of Pervious called the Badlands where they would be able to remove Alana's fetus. Afterwards, Alana banishes Sir Robot IV and forbids him from returning to the treehouse. Hazel and Petrichor have an awkward conversation about body issues. Alana returns to inform Marko of her plans to journey to the Badlands alone, but Marko insists on joining her. Animated creatures made out of excrement suddenly appear nearby and attack the family. To her surprise, Alana manages to defeat the dung people by shooting flames from her hand.
"Chapter Forty-Four"	44	June 28, 2017
A local family of Pervious bandits ambush and kill a Landfallian soldier and his pregnant lover on their way to an abortion. The bandits find footprints leading deeper into Pervious territory and decide to follow the tracks. In the treehouse rocketship, the family is coming to terms with Alana's newfound magical abilities while realizing the need to have the fetus removed as soon as possible before it threatens her life. Hazel insists on coming with her parents to the Badlands, while Petrichor is entrusted with Marko's translation ring and tasked to defend the treehouse in their absence. Alana, Marko, and Hazel stow away on a Landfallian cargo train en route to their destination. The family of bandits manages to trace the footprints, which lead to Petrichor standing guard outside the treehouse. After waking from a nightmare, Alana is shocked to discover a young boy with hybrid features from Wreath and Landfall is claiming to be her son.
"Chapter Forty-Five"	45	July 26, 2017
Petrichor confronts the family of Pervious bandits outside of the treehouse rocketship and ends up outnumbered and incapacitated. Aboard the cargo train, Marko explains that the hybrid boy they are seeing is a product of Alana unconsciously casting a powerful projection spell used by the High Clerics of Wreath to determine future outcomes of certain events. The boy introduces himself as Kurti, and Hazel awakens in time to see and interact with the projection of her would-be younger brother. Marko warns that the longer Alana sustains the projection of Kurti, the higher the risk of her getting cardiac arrest. Petrichor manages to injure the matriarch of the bandit family and is subsequently saved from death by the arrival of Sir Robot IV. Alana suffers a heart attack just outside of their intended destination and the projection of Kurti fades away. Marko urges Hazel to perform a spell that mimics the effect of defibrillation, and Hazel successfully revives her mother back to life. The family is then greeted by the presence of a wolf-like creature with bloodied paws, who informs them that they are "in such very good hands".
"Chapter Forty-Six"	46	August 30, 2017
The family of Pervious bandits depart after Sir Robot IV orders them to leave the premises under the threat of death, though Petrichor lashes out at Robot IV for his act of heroism in rescuing her from harm. During their tense exchange, Robot IV informs Petrichor that he is aware of her transgender identity and also discloses his sexual fluidity. In the Badlands, the wolf-like creature introduces herself as Endwife to Marko and Hazel and invites them into her home, where it is revealed that she is a mother to a litter of pups. Endwife and Marko engage in a difficult conversation about their individual views on abortion before she begins to remove the fetus from Alana's unconscious form. The projection of Kurti reappears to Hazel briefly, and she sings to him a lullaby that Izabel once sang to her until he fades away. Back at the treehouse, cultural and political tensions between Robot IV and Petrichor come to a head when the pair unexpectedly ends up in a passionate embrace.
"Chapter Forty-Seven"	47	September 27, 2017
Ianthe reveals to her prisoner, The Will, that she is a diplomat, and the former fiancée of Hektor, the Sextillion Loss Prevention agent he killed while rescuing Sophie on Indica in Chapter 9. Desiring revenge, she uses a mind-scanning device on The Will to find loved ones of his that she can hurt with impunity, as her diplomatic immunity will protect her from legal prosecution. Learning about Marko and Alana, however, Ianthe decides to hunt them down for monetary gain, and forces The Will to cooperate.
"Chapter Forty-Eight"	48	October 25, 2017
On the unnamed pocket world, Ghüs continues to look after Squire and has provided sanctuary for Upsher and Doff. Faced with a severe food shortage for several months and Doff delirious with starvation, Ghüs is forced to hunt down a wild creature known as a Dread Naught, which is invisible to others but can be seen by Robots. Due to the nature of the creature they are going to capture, Ghüs reluctantly allows Squire to join him on the hunt, and the pair bond through a deeply personal conversation as they journey deeper into the woods. They eventually encounter the Dread Naught, but Squire cannot bring himself to kill the creature and it escapes. The pair make their way back to the homestead where they are greeted by the welcome arrival of Sir Robot IV, Marko, Alana, and Petrichor bearing food. IV apologizes to his son for the delay in his return and introduces him to the runaway family, with Hazel now displaying her capability for flight, and revealing in narration that Squire would become her brother.

=== Volume Nine ===
Title	Issue #	Release date
"Chapter Forty-Nine"	49	February 28, 2018
Ianthe arrives on the unnamed pocket world with The Will, now wearing restraints with which Ianthe can cause him pain, in order to keep him prisoner. They find the family gone, but Ianthe finds evidence of their passage. As the treehouse rocketship travels through space, Petrichor and Sir Robot IV's relationship becomes sexual, though she rebuffs his romantic feelings towards her. Upsher and Doff reveal that under the Source Protection Program of the tabloid they report for on Jetsam, The Hebdomadal, Marko and Alana could publicize their story in exchange for being granted new identities, including magically altered Jetsamian bodies. Sir Robot, desiring this for himself, Petrichor and Squire the same bargain Upsher and Doff presented to Alana and Marko, offers the journalists a bombshell story of his own regarding the true cause of the destruction of Phang.
"Chapter Fifty"	50	March 28, 2018
As the family hides at Airland, an abandoned beachside amusement park while refueling on Jetsam, Marko and Alana discuss the offer given to them by Upsher and Doff. Sir Robot IV discloses his knowledge about the collusion between Landfall and Wreath to the journalists, who then forward it to their publisher. Petrichor teaches Hazel defensive martial arts and spellcasting, and reveals that she will join Sir Robot and Squire in the Source Protection Program. Squire, however, schemes to run away, taking with him Hazel's coveted doll, Ponk Konk, as a memento. Elsewhere on Jetsam, Zlote, a former colleague of Doff's, is confronted by Ianthe who—with The Will in tow—demands the whereabouts of the journalists.
"Chapter Fifty-One"	51	April 25, 2018
Squire confronts Sir Robot over the latter's murder of The Stalk, prompting Robot to become momentarily violent. However, he rethinks his reaction, and attempts to be more reassuring. Alana becomes enthralled by Marko's foray into writing fiction. After Petrichor expresses skepticism that The Hebdomadal will be impartial in its documenting of the family's story, Upsher learns that the paper will print it on the front page the following week, and that delivery of the ingredients for the family's transformation is imminent. Ianthe arrives on Jetsam with The Will and confronts Doff. During an ensuing struggle, Ianthe kills Doff, but The Will escapes his bonds, complicating Ianthe's hunt.
"Chapter Fifty-Two"	52	May 30, 2018
As Squire sets off on his own, the family discovers his good-bye note. Following Alana's momentary anger at Sir Robot's revelation about his violent act toward Squire earlier, the family sets off to find him. Meanwhile, Ianthe finds a note from The Will, telling her that in light of his prior killing of her fiancé, and her killing of Sweet Boy, they are even, and urges her to abandon her pursuit of him. She subsequently rescues Squire from a vicious animal. As Sir Robot discovers Ianthe's craft, he is confronted by The Will, who impales Robot's arm with his lance. He intends to exact revenge on Robot's murder of The Stalk, before resuming his own pursuit of the family, but Robot offers to help him capture Hazel in exchange for sparing his life.
"Chapter Fifty-Three"	53	June 27, 2018
On Jetsam, Special Agent Gale confronts the editor of The Hebdomadal and blackmails him by threatening to expose Upsher and Doff's homosexual relationship, which is illegal on Jetsam, as well as smear one of their sources, who has recently committed suicide. At Airland, Ghüs and Petrichor discover Doff's corpse and attempt to warn the others. Ianthe confronts Hazel and Upsher with her hostage, Squire, and informs them of Doff's death. When Alana appears mid-air, Ianthe destroys one of her wings, but Upsher then shoots Ianthe. Marko tries to persuade The Will to free Prince Robot IV, despite overhearing the latter's attempts to buy his survival with Hazel. Unmoved, the Will decapitates Robot IV with his bare hands.
"Chapter Fifty-Four"	54	July 25, 2018
The Will attempts to use his lance to kill Marko, but it malfunctions and explodes, leaving his gauntlet-covered right hand a mass of twisted metal. Marko attacks The Will, and they fall off a cliff into Ianthe's spacecraft. The Will activates the craft's propulsion, sending it into the atmosphere, but Marko gains the upper hand, further mutilating the remnants of The Will's right hand, though he ultimately decides to spare The Will's life. In response, The Will kills Marko by impaling his damaged cybernetic hand through Marko's chest. The chapter closes with a flashback showing one of Marko's last conversations with Hazel on the beach.

== Book Four ==
=== Volume Ten ===
Volume Ten is set three years after Marko's death, and a week after Hazel's tenth birthday, making her the same age as the series. The arc introduces Hazel's adolescent love of music, and addresses her grief over the death of her father. The arc is collected in a volume with an October 2022 publication date, while the series is scheduled to resume in January 2023.

Title	Issue #	Release date
"Chapter Fifty-Five"	55	January 26, 2022
Three years after Marko's death, and a week after Hazel's tenth birthday, Alana and her business associate, Bombazine, make money by illegally selling wholesale baby formula planetside, while Hazel, who now commits petty theft, is able to fly easily, and use magic to protect herself. The family has adopted Squire, who was so traumatized by his father's death that he has been mute ever since. The Will finally returns to Wreath High Command with Marko's skull, but learns that the deceased Vez has been replaced by Gwendolyn, who has sent Sophie to a boarding school. Gwen is so overcome with emotion upon seeing Marko's remains that she strips naked on the spot and has sex with The Will, during which she invites him to the Robot Kingdom to help her win the war. When the treehouse rocketship is confronted by an immense pirate ship, Hazel learns that to make ends meet, Alana has actually been engaging in smuggling, though Hazel is unaware that the product Alana trafficks is drugs.
"Chapter Fifty-Six"	56	February 23, 2022
The family is greeted by the pirate ship's five-person crew, which consists of members of various races, led by a Wreather calling himself Skipper. King Robot mourns Sir Robot IV, whose remains have been returned to him. Against the advice of Countess Robot X, who says he should concentrate his attention on the homefront rather than on the type of endeavor that got his son killed, King Robot demands the capture of IV's killer, and is informed that a visitor has arrived who knows who killed IV. When Skipper's crew tell Bombazine and Hazel that they are an aspiring band, for whom Skipper has promised to produce their first demo, Hazel is intrigued when she learns one of them plays the guitar, which becomes her "first addiction". When Alana tells Skipper that she doesn't use the Fadeaway that she smuggles because she is sober, and hopes to make enough money to go legit, he tells her that the government deliberately poisons it to discourage its use. He invites her to join him on a "side hustle", delivering the drug to the planet Perigons, where drug dealers are executed, in exchange for help obtaining a legal vendor's license like his. Alana accepts, but when she refuses Skipper's demand that she disrobe to prove she isn't a Landfallian, he becomes violent, and threatens to rape her children in front of her if she refuses.
"Chapter Fifty-Seven"	57	March 23, 2022
In a flashback set a few weeks after Marko's death, the family revisits Endwife in the Badlands of the planet Pervious, whom Alana has remove both her infected, irreparably damaged right wing, as well as her left one. As payment, Endwife says she will introduce Alana to her "contact in pharmaceuticals". Back in the present, Alana disrobes to show Skipper her now-wingless back. Convinced she is not a Landfallian, Skipper apologizes for his prior threat, and invites her to help him deliver his shipment of Fadeaway to a seller, offering her a bonus in addition to the medallion he had promised her. Meanwhile, per Gwendolyn's instructions, The Will delivers Marko's skull to King Robot, telling him that it was Marko who killed Robot IV, a political maneuver by Gwendolyn that the adult Hazel's narration notes will have consequences. Accepting Skipper's offer, Alana has Bombazine and the children remain with Skipper's crew, one of whom, Guitar, gives Hazel the eponymous instrument. Guitar also gets to know Bombazine, who she says reminds her of someone she once knew, whom she says was "a heartless psycho."
"Chapter Fifty-Eight"	58	April 27, 2022
Alana bonds with Skipper's buyer on Perigons, whom she learns also lost his spouse, and ponders his suggestion that she finish Marko's book. Hazel struggles to learn the guitar, while Squire is revealed to be a natural talent on drums. Skipper privately confronts Bombazine with the knowledge that he used to be a deadly mercenary known as La Buĉisto ("The Butcher"), and that while Guitar and Alana are unaware of this, he has made arrangements for this knowledge to be made public if Skipper or his crew are victims of foul play. He then asks Bombazine for a "favor". Agent Gale is confronted by Director Croze, who excoriates Gale for the fact that Hazel, who can threaten their way of life, remains at large. She then charges him with personally hunting her down and kiling not only her, but three other "loose ends": Petrichor, Upsher, and Ghüs.
"Chapter Fifty-Nine"	59	May 25, 2022
When Squire is accidentally kicked in the head during a brawl among the bandmates, Hazel angrily threatens them. Alana and Skipper complete their business arrangement. Agent Gale approaches a former Wreather collaborator named Tjumpseat now living on Landfall, and blackmails him into performing an illegal spell on Marko's skull in order to determine Hazel's whereabouts. The skull is destroyed, but the spell determines Marko's closest relative to be on Landfall itself. Gale then kills Tjumpseat. As the band breaks up, Drums and Guitar, whose real names are revealed to be Dranken and Hectare, hitch a ride with the family, but Bombazine decides to stay on as Skipper's First Mate, much to Alana's objections. Though Bombazine does not reveal Skipper's blackmail, he alludes to his dark past, and when Alana pleads that the children revere him, he excoriates her as an unfit mother, leading the two to part ways. After the family departs, Squire reveals to Hazel that he is in love with her.
"Chapter Sixty"	60	July 6, 2022
Agent Gale interrogates Klara, during which she is heartbroken to learn that Marko is dead, though Gale's attempt to murder her is foiled by a sympathetic prison guard. On an unnamed pyramid-shaped planet, Alana and Hazel are now able to continue their baby formula sales legally, allowing Alana to pay for Squire's continued therapy and a night out at a family entertainment center. Although Hazel tells Squire that she will always love him as a brother, she does not reciprocate the romantic feelings of love he has expressed for her. Upon returning to the rocketship treehouse, the family finds it engulfed in flames. This renders them homeless, and prompts renewed grief for them, in particular Hazel, as the setting of her happiest memories of Marko has now been destroyed.

=== Volume Eleven ===
The opening of Volume Eleven, which is Chapter 61, is set six months after the end of Chapter Sixty. With this issue, the series increased in price to $3.99, after having been priced at $2.99 since its debut.

Title	Issue #	Release date
"Chapter Sixty-One"	61	January 25, 2023
Gwendolyn has a dream of the night Marko proposed to her right before he was sent off to the frontlines, which devolves into a nightmare in which his corpse taunts her. After Sophie catches her and The Will in bed, Gwendolyn reveals that she and her wife Velour are separated, and that after spending time contacting Wreath parents whose children were killed in action, she has hatched a plan with The Will to bring the Robots onto their side. Petrichor, who is estranged from the family, confronts The Will's agent, Erving, regarding The Will's murder of Marko. Six months after being rendered homeless, the family now lives in a tent city on the street. Alana works in a warehouse, while Hazel and Squire resort to panhandling. Squire displays the ability to shape-shift his right arm for the first time. Needing transit documents to leave the planet, which has become a front in the Landfall-Wreath war, Alana goes to see a friend named Vitch, who offers to forge them for her. When she learns that Alana is a widow, Vitch also says that she can acquire the ingredients for a spell that will bring Marko back to life, which Hazel overhears. The issue holds a critics rating of 8.5 out of 10 at the review aggregator website Comic Book Round Up.
"Chapter Sixty-Two"	62	February 22, 2023
In flashback, Petrichor brings Alana to Marko's decapitated body. Resolving that nothing can bring back the dead, and noting that she needs to protect her children, Alana eschews any notion of revenge, which Marko would not have wanted. This prompts Petrichor, who desires retribution for Sir Robot IV's murder, to part ways with her. In the present, Alana agrees to purchase a travel pass from Vitch, but turns down her offer to resurrect Marko, later explaining to Hazel that the offer was a scam. The Will tells Sophie that he plans to propose to Gwendolyn with the translation ring he removed from Marko's corpse. Gwendolyn then appears to urge The Will to leave, telling Sophie she must help her prepare for the arrival of an unexpected "rich and powerful" visitor. Quoting A Nighttime Smoke to Hazel and Squire, Alana reads, "Revenge is retarded." Squire, who has been the target of that epithet, walks away, his thoughts centered upon Vitch. An acquaintance of Marko's named Ginny returns home to find her family tied up by Agent Gale, who questions her about Upsher. Ginny stabs him, but Gale shoots her dead, and then her family, whom he says he hadn't planned to leave alive in any event. The issue holds a critics rating of 8.4 out of 10 at the review aggregator website Comic Book Round Up.
"Chapter Sixty-Three"	63	April 5, 2023
In flashback, Petrichor has doubts about her and Sir Robot IV's plan to change their identities to begin new lives, in light of her past deeds, but Robot IV tells her how parenthood taught him about forgiveness. In the present, she forces Erving to lead her to The Will, though he warns her that The Will is a more confident, lethal killer than he was before. Alana, who longs to leave her job at the fulfillment center, and the planet, learns that a job on a circus ship from a non-aligned world can provide her passage and work for her and the children, but is ambivalent about the idea of child labor. Countess Robot X is revealed to be the "rich and powerful" visitor whom Gwendolyn and Sophie ask to sign a non-aggression pact with Wreath. The Countess says that the rest of the Coalition will see it as an act of war, but Gwendolyn shows her a long list of worlds in Wreath's vast, expanding empire that have signed it. Vitch shows Squire and a skeptical Hazel an expensive, four-dimensional dust called Wormfood that revives a dead insect, but more is needed for beings that have been dead for a longer period of time. As a concealed observer watches, Hazel and Squire break into a storehouse to get more of the substance. When they are attacked by a lying cat patrolling the premises, Squire morphs his arm into a cannon and kills it, revealing this ability to Hazel for the first time. The issue holds a critics rating of 7.8 out of 10 at the review aggregator website Comic Book Round Up.
"Chapter Sixty-Four"	64	May 10, 2023
Gale questions Dranken about Alana. Following Alana's instructions, Dranken vaguely mentions "a lighthouse" to him, prompting Gale to depart. Hazel expresses regret over the lying cat's death. When she expresses surprise that Squire can do this, Squire, speaking for the first time since his father's death, says it felt natural to him. The concealed observer watching the children is revealed to be a Constable, and warns them that Vitch deceived them with a hallucinogenic powder, as she had done to convince him she could resurrect his deceased daughter, and that because of the illegal things he did at her before realizing she was a con artist, he could not arrest her for fear of having his own crimes exposed. Squire, envisioning the burning rocketship treehouse, doesn't believe him, calling him a "firebug", and says he will kill him if he tries to stop them from taking the Wormfood. Petrichor returns to her home on Wreath to retrieve the family's heirloom bow, which she calls the "death-dealer". She tells her mother, in their first meeting since Petrichor's transition, that she will use it on a mission of vengeance. Alana seeks employment from Whist, the manager of a circus ship, who tells her that if she and her children can work, they can join him when the ship leaves in thirty minutes. The issue holds a critics rating of 7.5 out of 10 at Comic Book Round Up.
"Chapter Sixty-Five"	65	June 21, 2023
Squire attacks the Constable with his weaponized arm, accusing him of being the arsonist who destroyed the treehouse, though the officer denies this. Realizing he has now exposed himself as a member of the Robot royal family, an angry Hazel flees with Squire, and together with Alana, they manage to reach Whist's circus ship in time as it prepares to leave the planet. Though Hazel is forced to leave her guitar behind, the adult Hazel narrates that it was one of the happier moments in their lives. On Wreath, Petrichor attacks The Will, Gwen, and Sophie by surprise. During the altercation, Petrichor is impaled through the abdomen by The Will's lance, but Sophie is hit with a poisoned arrow intended for The Will, for which Gwendolyn says there is no cure. The issue holds a critics rating of 9 out of 10 at Comic Book Round Up.
"Chapter Sixty-Six"	66	September 20, 2023
In flashback, Gale meets Alana during their time as basic training recruits on Landfall, and Alana's casual rejection of him during their initial encounter prompts Gale to harbor a deep, grudging resentment towards Alana and views her as a "fucking cunt". In the present, Agent Gale arrives on the lighthouse planet of Quietus and enters the fully restored residence of the deceased author, D. Oswald Heist. He encounters Ianthe—revealed to be still alive yet facially disfigured—imprisoned in the basement but is rendered unconscious by a knockout gas. Gale awakens bound to a chair and is confronted by Ghüs and Upsher, where the latter reveals that he has spared Ianthe's life in order to rehabilitate her and demolish the cycle of revenge and violence. Gale manages to break free from his restraints and almost succeeds in killing Upsher but is knocked unconscious by Ianthe. Upsher admits his mistake for not listening to Ianthe's warnings about Gale, but she waves off his apology and reminds Upsher about the first step of the rehabilitation process: forgiveness.

=== Volume Twelve ===
Title	Issue #	Release date
"Chapter Sixty-Seven"	67	July 31, 2024
Six months after joining the traveling circus, Hazel works as a backstage creature wrangler, while Alana is tasked with security duties as a bouncer, managing conflicts between circus staff. She is asked out to dinner by a bartender named Feld, who takes an interest in her. The Will and Gwendolyn mourn the death of Sophie on the planet first featured back in Chapter Thirteen, where the flora and fauna contain the hallucinogenic substance, Heroine. The Will rejects a call from an informant interested in Alana's bounty, while Gwendolyn, overcome with grief, asks The Will for more Heroine so she can see Sophie one last time. Back on the circus ship, Squire distracts himself by viewing transmissions from an Open Circuit helmet procured from one of the ship's employees. Hazel encounters an arachnid alien named Emesis, which an adult Hazel narrates became her "best friend for life".
"Chapter Sixty-Eight"	68	August 28, 2024
In flashback, a young Alana is picked up by her father Rustik from school after being involved in a bullying incident, leading to him instructing Alana to be more mindful of the kinds of people she should associate with for her safety. In the present day, Alana meets Hazel's new friend Emesis, shares her concerns about Squire's well-being with her boss Whist, and remains on friendly terms with Feld. Petrichor is revealed to have survived her deadly skirmish with The Will and is celebrating her victory at a nightclub on an unnamed planet. A female serpentine alien approaches her with sexual interest and Petrichor experiences a brief vision of Sophie. On the circus ship, Hazel and Emesis continue to bond despite their differences, while Squire distracts himself in isolation with his Open Circuit helmet. After flipping through several shows, he comes across a live news report from the Robot Kingdom, where poverty-stricken civilians angrily protest against the Robot Monarchy and their continued war alliance with Landfall. Overwhelmed with feelings of indirect guilt, Squire self-harms while still wearing the helmet.
"Chapter Sixty-Nine"	69	September 25, 2024
During a jam session, Emesis comments on Hazel's inability to play the guitar and instead encourages her to become a singer. Alana finds Squire emotionally distressed after his self-inflicted injury and she reassures her love for him despite his actions. Elsewhere, The Will and Gwendolyn remain in a drug-addled haze due to their consumption of Heroine. The Will experiences a vision of Sophie who tells the mercenary to kill himself. Gwendolyn, however, sees a bloodied hallucination of Marko upon waking. At the circus ship's first aid station, Whist recommends that Squire be sent to a special facility to help treat his anxiety, with Hazel and Emesis secretly eavesdropping on the scene. Feld approaches Alana after hearing about Squire's condition. Their conversation is interrupted when an unknown caller contacts Feld and seemingly alludes to confirming the identity of Alana. On Wreath, Velour and Lying Cat are visited by Countess Robot X who is seeking Gwendolyn's whereabouts. Countess X explains the change of the Robot Kingdom's allegiance from Landfall to Wreath brokered by Gwendolyn and asks Velour for help in finding her. Velour agrees on the condition that Countess X kill The Will in retribution for ruining her marriage. Despite her initial reluctance, Countess X accepts Velour's terms.
"Chapter Seventy"	70	November 6, 2024
An angry Hazel lashes out at Alana and voices her disapproval of Squire's decision to temporarily leave for several months and get mental health therapy at a recovery center called Windy Tooth. Elsewhere on the circus ship, Whist summons Feld and secretly tasks him with finding out the identity of a possible Fadeaway drug dealer in their midst who is making outgoing calls with enchanted encryption. On an unnamed ringed planet, Hazel's former prison schoolteacher, Noreen, is surprised by the appearance of Petrichor in her home. Petrichor confesses to living a difficult and traumatic life since her escape from incarceration and asks for Noreen's help to put her back in Landfall's prison. A counselor from Windy Tooth arrives to pick up Squire and despite her earlier misgivings, Hazel bids her brother a loving farewell and is comforted by Emesis after he departs. While attempting to trace the whereabouts of Agent Gale on a planetoid, his superior Director Croze receives a call from a greedy informant with knowledge of Alana and Hazel and is revealed to be one of the clowns under Whist's employ.
"Chapter Seventy-One"	71	January 1, 2025
A few weeks after Squire's departure, Emesis argues with Hazel over what she feels is a betrayal of trust. As a gesture of reconciliation, Hazel reveals her wings and biracial status to Emesis. Countess Robot X successfully locates Gwendolyn and The Will inside their ship on the Heroine-rich planet, finding them both under the heavy influence of the hallucinogen. With a comatose Will entranced by a drug-induced dream, Countess X takes Gwendolyn and deliberately knocks over a canister chafing fuel, starting a fire as she leaves. When Whist discovers the unscrupulous clown intending to claim the bounty on the runaway family, he kills him for betraying his fellow carnies. Alana finally accepts Feld's offer for a date in his private quarters. They nearly kiss, but Feld ultimately reveals that he is a private investigator hired by her dying father, Rustik, who wishes to see Alana before he dies.
"Chapter Seventy-Two"	72	March 19, 2025
Through a live broadcast via radio and television, King Robot officially severs the Robot Kingdom's alliance with Landfall and switches their allegiance to Wreath with immediate effect. The royal proclamation is heard by various characters scattered throughout the galaxy. On Skipper's pirate ship, Bombazine argues with his crewmates and expresses fears that ordinary civilians will suffer the consequences of this development. On Quietus, Ghüs, Upsher, and Ianthe hope for a potential ceasefire to emerge with a still-imprisoned Gale convinced that it will result in an apocalypse. In Noreen's home, it is revealed that Petrichor has entered a sexual relationship with the former schoolteacher, with Petrichor sensing a chance for redemption upon hearing the news. Elsewhere in space, Alana, Hazel, Emesis, and Feld have departed the circus ship and are en route to Rustik aboard a private vessel. Due to poor signal reception from their ship's radio, the group remains unaware of the recent events as they avoid an interstellar skirmish between Landfallian and Wreather battleships.
