= Andrew Foley =

Andrew Foley may refer to:

- Andrew Foley (writer) Canadian writer, editor, and artist of comic books and graphic novels
- Andrew Foley (MP) (c.1748–1818), youngest son of Thomas Foley, 1st Baron Foley, and MP for Droitwich from 1774 to 1818
- Andrew Foley (Home and Away), fictional character in Australian soap opera Home and Away
- Andrew Foley Senior, father of the above
