= Saga (comics) =

Science-fiction/fantasy comic book series

- Cover art for Saga #1 (March 2012) by Fiona Staples

Publication information
- Publisher: Image Comics
- Schedule: Monthly (March 2012 - July 2018) | Irregular (January 2022 - Present)
- Format: Ongoing series
- Genre: Epic space opera, fantasy
- Publication date: March 2012 – present (hiatus from July 2018 to January 2022)
- No. of issues: 72
- Main characters: Alana; Marko; Hazel; Prince Robot IV; The Will

Creative team
- Written by: Brian K. Vaughan
- Artist: Fiona Staples

Collected editions
- Volume One: ISBN 1-60706-601-7
- Volume Two: ISBN 1-60706-692-0
- Volume Three: ISBN 1-60706-931-8
- Volume Four: ISBN 1-63215-077-8
- Volume Five: ISBN 1-63215-438-2
- Volume Six: ISBN 1-63215-711-X
- Volume Seven: ISBN 1-5343-0060-0
- Volume Eight: ISBN 1-5343-0349-9
- Volume Nine: ISBN 1-5343-0837-7
- Volume Ten: ISBN 1-5343-2334-1
- Volume Eleven: ISBN 1-5343-9913-5
- Volume Twelve: ISBN 1-5343-5533-2

Saga is an epic space opera fantasy comic book series written by Brian K. Vaughan and illustrated by Fiona Staples, published monthly by the American company Image Comics. Based on ideas Vaughan conceived both as a child and as a parent, the series follows a husband and wife Alana and Marko, from long-warring extraterrestrial races, fleeing authorities from both sides of a galactic war as they struggle to care for their daughter, Hazel, who is born in the beginning of the series, and who occasionally narrates the series as an unseen adult.

The comic has been described in solicitations as "Star Wars meets A Game of Thrones", evocative of both science fiction and fantasy epics such as The Lord of the Rings, as well as classic works like Romeo and Juliet. It is Vaughan's first creator-owned work to be published through Image Comics, and is the first time he employs narration in his comics writing. Vaughan has stated that the entire series will span 108 issues, or chapters.

The first chapter of Saga was published on March 14, 2012 to positive reviews and a sold-out first printing. It was published in trade paperback form in October 2012. It has also been a consistent sales success, with its collected editions outselling those of The Walking Dead, another successful Image comic. The series went on hiatus after reaching its midpoint at Chapter 54 in July 2018, and resumed in January 2022.

Saga has been met with widespread critical acclaim, becoming one of the most celebrated comics being published in the United States. It has garnered numerous awards, including twelve Eisner and seventeen Harvey Awards between 2013 and 2017. The first trade paperback collection won the 2013 Hugo Award for Best Graphic Story. It has also been noted for its diverse portrayal of ethnicity, sexuality, and gender social roles, and for its treatment of war.

== Publication history ==
Writer Brian K. Vaughan conceived Saga in his childhood, calling it "a fictional universe that I created when I was bored in math class. I just kept building it." He was inspired by Star Wars, Flash Gordon, children's books, and the awe and wonder of first seeing the Silver Surfer, which seemed an "incredible and different" concept to him. When his wife became pregnant with his second daughter, he conceived of the protagonists, the winged Alana and the horned Marko, two lovers from warring extraterrestrial races who struggle to survive with their newborn daughter, Hazel, who occasionally narrates the series. It was also at this point that the central theme that Vaughan wanted for the book emerged. Vaughan explains, "I wanted to write about parenthood, but I wanted to Trojan-horse it inside some sort of interesting genre story, to explore the overlap between artistic creation and the creation of a child." Vaughan intended to return to writing a comics series following the 2010 conclusion of his previous series, Ex Machina, and notes that the publication of Saga #1 was connected to bringing a new child into the world.

I realized that making comics and making babies were kind of the same thing and if I could combine the two, it would be less boring if I set it in a crazy sci-fi fantasy universe and not just have anecdotes about diaper bags ... I didn't want to tell a Star Wars adventure with these noble heroes fighting an empire. These are people on the outskirts of the story who want out of this never-ending galactic war ... I'm part of the generation that all we do is complain about the prequels and how they let us down ... And if every one of us who complained about how the prequels didn't live up to our expectations just would make our own sci-fi fantasy, then it would be a much better use of our time.

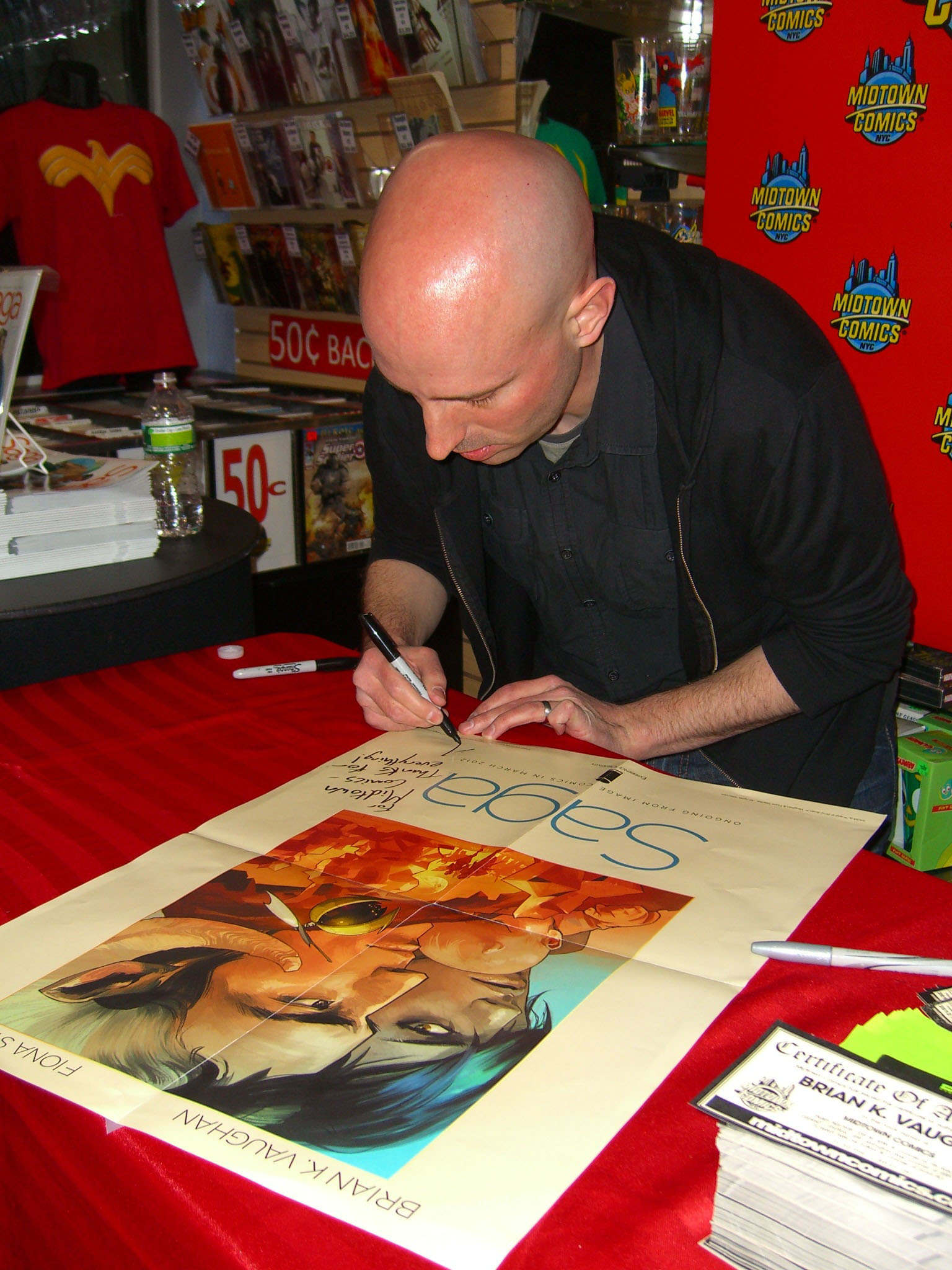
Writer Brian K. Vaughan signing a poster for the series at Midtown Comics in Manhattan a day after the first issue's release

Vaughan explained that the main characters' romance would be a major theme of the book, and that the series would observe the young protagonist grow up in "real time" across roughly eighteen years. Touching upon the juxtaposition of the book's mature subject matter with its Star Wars inspirations, Vaughan jokingly described the book as "Star Wars for perverts."

The book was announced at the 2011 San Diego Comic-Con, and was billed as "Star Wars meets A Game of Thrones" in solicitations. Saga represents the first time Vaughan has employed narration in his comics writing, a decision influenced by the whimsical interaction between the text and images in the children's books he reads with his children, and by his desire to try something new that he felt would work well with Saga's narrator, Hazel. It is also his first series to be published through Image Comics, which he selected as the series' publisher on the recommendation of the writer Jay Faerber. Vaughan elaborated on his selection of Image thus:

I love all the other companies I've worked with, but I think Image might be the only publisher left that can still offer a contract I would consider "fully creator-owned." Saga is a really important story to me, so I wanted a guarantee of no content restrictions or other creative interference, and I needed to maintain 100% control and ownership of all non-publishing rights with the artist, including the right to never have our comic turned into a movie or television show or whatever ... [Image Publisher] Eric Stephenson was the only publisher I spoke with who was thrilled to make that deal, and co-creator Fiona Staples and I didn't have to sign exclusives or agree to work on a bunch of corporate-owned titles to get it.

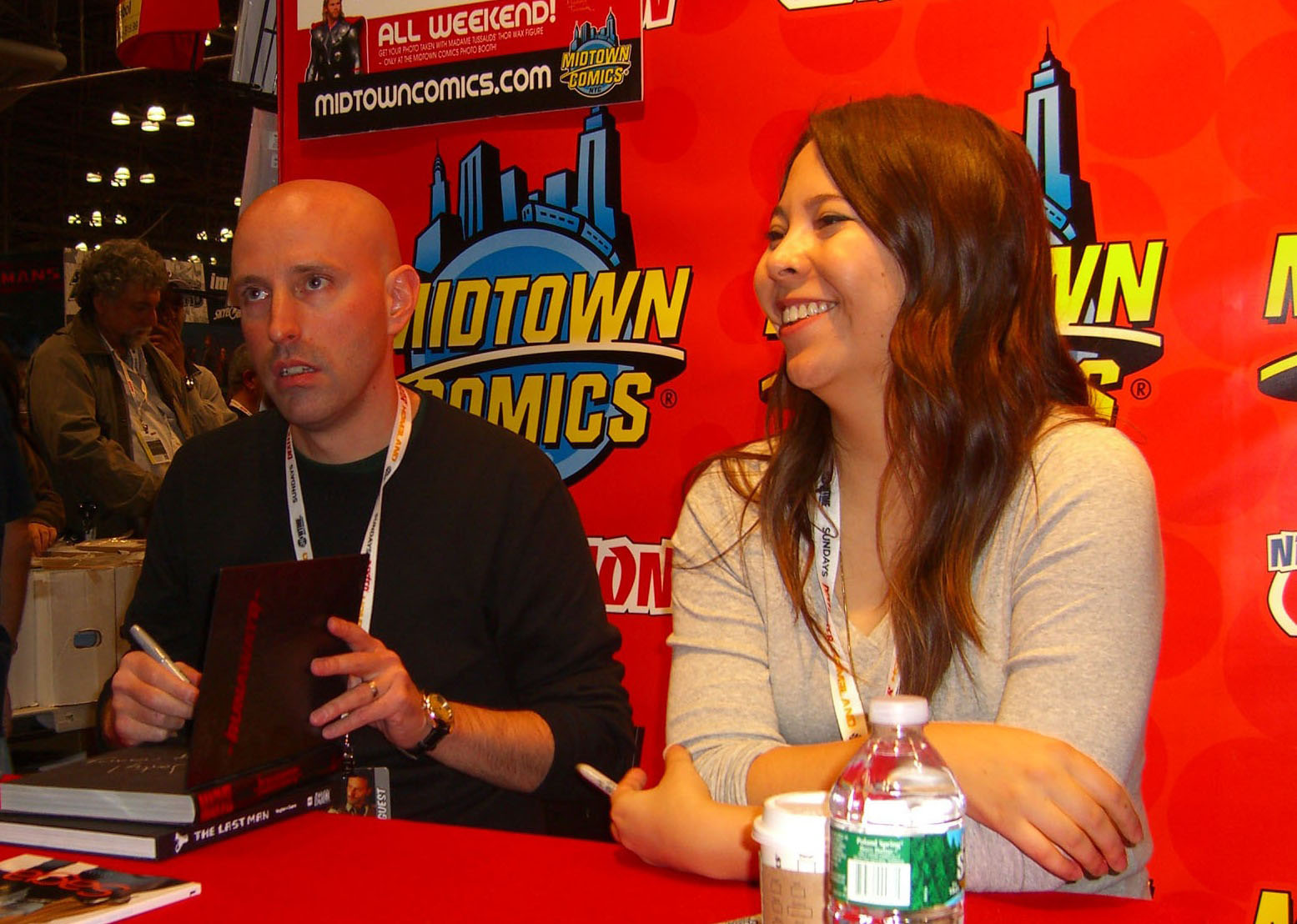
Vaughan and Staples signing copies of the book for fans at the Midtown Comics booth at the 2012 New York Comic Con

Although Vaughan has written for television and has endeavored to have his previous works adapted into film, he stresses that he developed Saga strictly to be a comic book and not to be adapted to other media, explaining "I wanted to do something that was way too expensive to be TV and too dirty and grown-up to be a four-quadrant blockbuster." Vaughan has also indicated that he has an ending in mind for the series, and that he plans five chapters ahead, having written the first six Chapters as the first story arc, which would have ended with the two main characters dying on the rocketship launch pad in Chapter 5 if the series had not been successful. By June 2016, Vaughan indicated that he knew what the last page of the series' final chapter would be.

The series is illustrated by Fiona Staples, who was introduced to Vaughan by their mutual friend, writer Steve Niles, with whom Staples worked on Mystery Society. Vaughan, who did not meet Staples in person until just before their panel at the 2011 San Diego Comic-Con, explained his selection of Staples by describing his reaction upon first seeing her work, saying, "Her artwork is incredible. [It] doesn't look like anyone else. She is very unique. When I opened up this file I was like, 'This is going to work!'" Staples is co-owner of Saga, and has received first billing since Chapter 25. In addition to designing all the characters, vehicles, and alien races in the story, she provides painted covers and hand-letters Hazel's narration using her own handwriting, which is the last thing she does after finishing the artwork on a page. Staples renders the characters in a pen-and-ink style line while using all-color settings inspired by video games and Japanese animation. At the 2012 Image Expo, Staples described the process by which she produces her art as harkening back to animation cels, in which emphasis is placed on figures and backgrounds. Vaughan has stated that Staples' style has influenced the direction of the story. The character Ghüs, for example is entirely Staples' creation. Another example is the organic forms of most of the series' technology, such as the main characters' wooden rocket ship, which is derived from Staples' dislike of drawing mechanical objects. To design the series' various planetary settings, Staples looks to the real world for inspiration and then exaggerates some elements of them. Some rooms on the planet Cleave, for example, were inspired by Cambodian architecture.

The book was priced at $2.99 for the majority of its run, which Vaughan arranged as part of his contract with Image, along with the stipulation that it never be less than 22 pages long. The first chapter features 44 pages of story and no advertisements in both its print and digital versions. In 2023, the price increased to $3.99, beginning with Chapter 61. At the end of each chapter is an old-fashioned letters column called "To Be Continued" which prints readers' letters submitted entirely through postal mail as it does not provide an email address for this purpose. Vaughan usually handles the column himself, including responding to letters.

One of the two panels in Chapter 12 for which Comixology initially prohibited sale of that chapter through iOS because of sexual content. Note the image on the screen.

The book's release was celebrated with a launch party at Los Angeles' Meltdown Comics which featured a public conversation with Vaughan's former colleague, Lost co-creator Damon Lindelof, who had hired Vaughan as a writer/producer on that series in 2007. Vaughan also promoted the book by appearing at signings at Midtown Comics in Manhattan and Bergen Street Comics in Brooklyn during the week of the first chapter's release.

After the publication of Chapter 6 in August 2012, Vaughan announced that the series would take a two-month hiatus, after which the first six-issue story arc was published in trade paperback form in October for $9.99 before the series' return in November, a practice that Vaughan and Staples would continue after each successive story arc and trade paperback publication. That same month, Vaughan and Staples promoted the series by appearing together at the 2012 New York Comic Con, their first appearance together since the series' debut. Some retailers refused to display the trade paperback because its cover (a reuse of the first chapter's cover) depicts Alana breastfeeding Hazel.

In December 2014, Image published Saga Deluxe Edition Volume 1, a hardcover volume collecting the first 18 chapter of the series, which make up its first three story arcs. Because Vaughan sees Saga as a story about Hazel, he and Staples decided to have each new hardcover volume feature an original image of that character at a different stage of her life. Because the first volume covers her birth and infancy, its cover features a closeup of Hazel nursing from her mother's breast, set against the backdrop of Landfall and Wreath, which recalls the first chapter's cover. Eric Stephenson warned Vaughan and Staples that some retailers and distributors would object to this cover image, thus limiting the series' audience, but after seeing Staples' rendition of the image, Stephenson decided that sales would not be a problem.

On July 25, 2018, Chapter #54 was published, ending the first half of the series' run on a major cliffhanger. The series then went on an extended hiatus, during which the first 54 chapters would be published in a single volume called Saga: Compendium One. In April 2019 Vaughan told Entertainment Weekly that the second half of the series would also last 54 issues, making what he called "a planned 108-issue epic".

On October 9, 2021, Vaughan and Staples announced during a panel discussion at the New York Comic Con that the series would return in January 2022 with Chapter #55, a double-length, 44-page chapter which would retain its normal $2.99 price, and begin "Compendium Two" of the series. The series resumed with Chapter 55, which went on sale January 26, 2022, to positive critical reviews. The series price went up to $3.99 with the release of Chapter 61 in 2023. After issue #72 was published in March 2025, the series resumed hiatus. In September 2026, Staples posted a message to social media explaining the delay in new issues was due to her taking time to restore her mental health while parenting and working on multiple projects, and that she had resumed work on the series.

== Plot ==
Each chapter of Saga is titled with a numerical Chapter, such as "Chapter 1" for the debut issue. Every six chapters make up a story arc designated as a "Volume" and are reprinted as trade paperbacks. Every three Volumes compose a "Book" and are collected as hardcover editions.

The opening Volume introduces the series' leads, Alana and Marko, two lovers from different worlds whose peoples are at war with one another. Alana comes from the technologically advanced Landfall Coalition, so named after Landfall, the largest planet in the galaxy, and Marko is from Wreath, Landfall's only satellite, whose people wield magic. Because the destruction of one of the worlds would send the other spinning out of orbit, the war was "outsourced" to other worlds. Although peace was restored on the two home worlds, the conflict spread across all the other known planets, whose native species were forced to choose a side. As Landfall and Wreath were on opposite sides, Alana and Marko met when she was assigned to guard him in a prison on the planet Cleave after he became a prisoner of war. They fell in love and escaped together twelve hours after meeting. In the beginning of the series' first issue, Alana gives birth to their daughter, Hazel, who narrates the series as an adult looking back on her life. Marko and Alana's respective people are incredulous when it is suggested that they have voluntarily mated and they are pursued by forces in service of both Wreath and Landfall, both because of the perceived betrayal of the two fugitives and to prevent knowledge of their pairing from spreading and damaging morale among their troops. On Landfall, Prince Robot IV of the Robot Kingdom, Landfall's closest allies, is sent to kill the entire family. On Wreath, a mercenary called The Will, along with his sidekick Lying Cat, a giant sphinx cat with the power to tell when people are lying, is hired to kill Marko and Alana and capture Hazel. However, when he learns that his ex and fellow mercenary The Stalk has been hired for the same job, he heads for Sextillion, a planet that appears composed completely of brothels. While following a map to Cleave's fabled Rocketship Forest, Marko, Alana, and Hazel are found by the Stalk. Marko is badly wounded, but the Stalk is scared off by the sound of encroaching Horrors, mysterious terrifying creatures that roam Cleave's woods. After the Stalk flees, the horrors reveal themselves to be the ghosts of children killed on Cleave. Their leader, Izabel, offers to help Alana find the snow necessary for the healing spell that can save Marko. Marko, delirious from his injuries, mentions an ex-fiancée named Gwendolyn. On Sextillion, The Will meets a six-year-old girl who has been sold into sex slavery. He kills her pimp, but does not manage to liberate her from Sextillion. Marko is successfully healed, and explains that he was engaged to Gwendolyn when he met Alana, but that they had grown apart as a result of his growing pacifism and her staunch patriotism. He also explains that the rings he proposed to Alana with, which also function as translators, were originally Gwendolyn's. Later, while nearing the Rocketship Forest, they are attacked by Landfall soldiers. Alana and Hazel are injured, sending the seemingly pacifistic Marko into a such a violent rage that Alana is forced to shoot him with a paralyzer before he goes too far. Prince Robot IV, having found the injured soldiers while following Marko and Alana's trail, encounters the Stalk. Having just learned of his wife's pregnancy, he is paranoid, and kills the Stalk. Moments later, the Stalk is called by the Will, asking for her help in rescuing the girl from Sextillion. Prince Robot IV answers and explains what happened. In response, the Will vows to kill Prince Robot IV and everyone he cares about. Marko and Alana reach the Rocketship Forest, but find it seemingly empty. Izabel reveals this to be an illusion created to protect it from outsiders. Learning that the Rocketship, essentially a giant treehouse, requires a sacrifice to be activated, Marko destroys his family's ancestral sword. Prince Robot IV, meanwhile, comes to suspect that Marko and Alana are headed for the planet of Quietus, where Alana's favorite author, D. Oswald Heist, lives. Indeed, heading for Quietus, Marko, Alana, Hazel, the Rocketship, and new babysitter Izabel, now bound to Hazel's soul, are in good spirits. The ship is soon attacked by a pair of armored Wreathans who mystically banish Izabel. They are soon revealed to be Barr and Klara, Marko's parents, and stand down upon seeing Hazel.

In the second Volume, more is revealed about Marko's parents and his upbringing and his initial time with Alana. Marko's ex-fiancée, Gwendolyn, makes her debut, helping the Will rescue the slave girl on Sextillion in exchange for assurance that he will kill Marko. They rescue her, killing several hired guns of Sextillion in the process. The girl, like all natives of Phang, the comet where she was born, has the power to hear the "voices" of objects which, because Gwendolyn has a pendant which was part of a set with Marko and Alana's wedding rings, she can use to track Marko and Alana. Marko and his mother Klara travel to the nearby planet that Izabel was banished to, getting into an argument about Alana in the process. They learn that it is not actually a planet, but the nearly hatched egg of a type of destructive celestial being called a Timesuck. In the Treehouse, Alana and Barr fight, and Alana learns that Barr has a magic-resistant terminal illness before he uses a sleep spell to knock her out. Marko and Klara find Izabel just as the Timesuck begins to hatch and Gwendolyn, The Will, Lying Cat and the girl close in on the treehouse. Gwendolyn tries to take the Will's ship closer to the Treehouse, ignoring the danger of the Timesuck, and nearly causing the Girl's death in the process. To protect the Treehouse from the Timesuck, Barr is forced to use the last of his strength on a spell, causing his heart to give out. Marko and Klara arrive back on the ship just as he dies.

The third Volume, beginning in August 2013, which Vaughan intended as a "big tonal shift", introduces the amphibian tabloid journalists Upsher and Doff, as they pursue their own investigation of Alana and Marko, who take refuge at the lighthouse home of author D. Oswald Heist. The Will, Gwendolyn, and the Girl, meanwhile have crash landed on an idyllic forest planet after surviving the Timesuck. There, the Will begins seeing visions of the deceased Stalk, and decides to name the girl Sophie. On Quietus, Marko and Alana are confronted with the reality that they will soon need to get actual jobs if they are ever to provide Hazel with a fulfilling childhood, while Heist and Klara begin a tentative courtship. On the forest planet, the Will tries to kiss Gwendolyn. She punches him, but subtly expresses an interest. Soon after, Gwendolyn and the Will independently discover that the planet's foliage, which they've been surviving on, contains a hallucinogen called Heroine which is to blame for the Will's visions. It is too late, however, as Sophie has been manipulated by a vision of her mother into brutally attacking the Will. Gwendolyn decides to find Marko, who she says knows a healing spell. Upsher and Doff, meanwhile, are kept from reporting on the story by another mercenary known as the Brand, who places a spell on them which will kill them should they ever tell others about their findings. Prince Robot IV arrives on Quietus first, getting into a shootout with Heist and Klara. Gwendolyn arrives soon after, taking Heist's life. She then finds Marko and Alana and, after learning that Marko's healing spell will not work on the Will, gets into a fight with them. Feigning defeat, Marko pushes Alana, Hazel in her arms, off the top of the lighthouse. However, Alana discovers that her wings are not merely vestigial, and shoots Gwendolyn with her paralyzer gun. Left in a fugue state by head injuries sustained during the fight, Prince Robot is manipulated by Izabel into rescuing Klara from the burning lighthouse. By story's end, the Will is in a coma at the hospital, where he is visited by the Brand, who is in fact his sister, also named Sophie, Lying Cat and the second Sophie are left in Gwendolyn's care, Prince Robot IV is aimless, and Hazel has taken her first steps.

The fourth Volume, which begins Book Two, establishes the family living on the planet Gardenia, technically undeclared in the war. Alana is working, through a favor from D. Oswald Heist's ex-wife Yuma, in an underground theatre company called the Open Circuit whose shows, projected across the galaxy, are a combination of soap opera and superhero content. Marko, using "Barr" as an alias, is working full time taking care of Hazel, who is now speaking in simple phrases. Prince Robot IV's son is born. A disgruntled, anti-monarchist robot janitor, Dengo, kills Prince Robot IV's wife, kidnaps his infant son and journeys to Gardenia. Prince Robot learns of this while taking a sabbatical on Sextillion, and vows to hunt down Dengo and save his family. Meanwhile, The Brand teams with Gwendolyn and Sophie to acquire an elixir to heal The Will's injuries. Alana begins using a drug called Fadeaway, while Marko begins an emotional affair with Ginny, Hazel's dance teacher. When they get into an argument about this, Marko flies into a rage and throws some groceries at Alana and she screams at him to leave the house. Hoping to publicize his anti-monarchist views, Dengo goes to the Open Circuit, but is talked by a self-interested Yuma into going after Hazel's family. Marko goes to Ginny's, but heads back for the treehouse when he realizes how far he's fallen. By the time he arrives, however, Hazel, Klara, and Alana have already gotten into a shootout with Dengo, who still has IV's son, which resulted in the ship launching and going off world. Robot Prince IV arrives on the scene moments after Marko, and the two determine to find their families together.

The fifth Volume begins three months later. The family's rocketship has set down in a frozen region of a planet, where Dengo meets with members of The Last Revolution, a radical anti-war group, who wish to use Hazel as a pawn in their campaign against Landfall and Wreath. Meanwhile, as Marko and Prince Robot IV struggle to maintain their alliance while in pursuit of their kidnapped loved ones, Alana and Yuma both deal with the consequences of their use of the drug Fadeaway. By the end of the arc, Dengo has turned on the revolutionaries, but is himself killed by Prince Robot IV, who is united with his son. Marko and Alana are reunited, but Hazel and Klara are relegated to a Landfallian prison. The Brand, Gwendolyn and Sophie have acquired the elixir, but the Brand is killed in the process.

In the sixth Volume, Alana and Marko search for Hazel and Klara, who remain incarcerated in a detention center on Landfall. Upsher and Doff resume their investigation of the couple after hearing of The Brand's death. The journalists are confronted by The Will, who has resumed his vendetta against Prince Robot IV. Meanwhile, Prince Robot is using the name Sir Robot and is raising his rapidly growing son, Squire. New characters introduced include Hazel's sympathetic schoolteacher Noreen and a transgender female prisoner, Petrichor. The arc closes with Hazel successfully reunited with her parents and the revelation that Alana is once again pregnant.

The seventh Volume, "The War for Phang", began with Chapter 37 and was released on August 31, 2016. It is the beginning of Book Three of the series, and as indicated by its title, Sophie's home, the comet Phang, is the central setting. The family deals with the addition of Petrichor to the reunited family, and Alana's second pregnancy.

The eighth Volume, "The Coffin", finds the family dealing with the effects of Alana's miscarriage after the events on Phang. Vaughan stated in an interview that Petrichor would continue to play an important role in Hazel's development, and that what has happened to The Will is another subplot explored in the arc.

The ninth Volume, collecting issues 49–54, centers around the ongoing dynamics between the family and their allied companions, which is complicated by the presence of their pursuers and building up to a shocking finale that sees the deaths of several characters. The end of this Volume also signals the extended hiatus of Brian K. Vaughan and Fiona Staples.

The tenth Volume, collecting issues 55–60, marks the beginning of Book Four of the series and sees a significant time jump in the narrative relative to the number of years Brian K. Vaughan and Fiona Staples have gone on hiatus. The family and their allies have gone their separate ways since the traumatic events from the previous Volume, with this story arc primarily focusing on Alana struggling as a now single parent trying to make ends meet for Hazel and Squire who are now preteens.

The eleventh Volume, collecting issues 61–66, is set six months after the end of the previous arc and follows three key storylines: Alana's resolve to improve the fortunes of her family, Gwendolyn's plan to sway the Robot Kingdom's allegiances over to Wreath, and Agent Gale being forced by Landfall's government to finish the mission of eliminating Hazel and the allies associated with her during the course of the series.

== Characters ==
=== The family ===
This section describes the family, including its extended members, and its most prominent recurring allies.

Alana
The female lead of the series, Alana is Marko's wife and Hazel's mother. She is a native of the planet Landfall, and like all Landfallians she has wings, although her wings do not allow her to fly until Chapter #18. After joining her planet's war against the Wreathers (the debut chapter says she was drafted after flunking out of state college while Chapter 14 says that she joined the military a few months after her father remarried Alana's childhood friend, Even), she was subsequently reprimanded for "abject cowardice" for hesitating to kill civilians, and was redeployed to the planet Cleave, where as a prison guard she met Marko. She developed a friendship with him and when she learned he was to be transferred to a more brutal prison from which detainees never return, she helped him escape, just twelve hours after having met him. She later married him and gave birth to their daughter, Hazel, in the series' first issue.

Although skin color is not a part of racial ethnicity that is explicitly addressed within the books' dialogue, writer Brian K. Vaughan and artist Fiona Staples have indicated that both Alana and Marko are people of color, and Staples designed Alana with darker skin. She envisioned her to be biracial, and her father as an Indian man.

Marko
The male lead of the series, Marko is Alana's husband and Hazel's father. He is from Landfall's moon Wreath, whose people have horns or antlers and can wield magic. Marko was a foot soldier in his people's war against the Coalition of Landfall. He was raised from a young age with the knowledge of the atrocities that Landfall committed against their people. When Marko left Wreath as an adult, he was still "a gung-ho kid who just wanted to do [his] moon proud and kick some ass." This changed the first time he saw battle, after which he began to develop a less militant and more pacifist outlook. When he tried to share these misgivings with his fiancée Gwen, he realized from her unsympathetic and jingoistic responses that they had grown too far apart to continue their relationship. Marko surrendered to Coalition forces as a "conscientious objector" 18 months before the beginning of the series. He was a prisoner of war on the planet Cleave until his guard, Alana, escaped with him, married him and conceived their daughter, Hazel. Wreath High Command sent The Will after Marko because Marko "renounced his oath and betrayed The Narrative" by fraternizing with an enemy combatant. Though he is a pacifist who vows upon the birth of his daughter to never again use his sword, and dislikes the practice of owning firearms, he does so nonetheless when his family is threatened and is so skilled with a sword that he can dispatch an entire squad of enemy soldiers armed with firearms, for which he is referred to by Prince Robot IV as a "force of nature". He is fatally stabbed through the chest by The Will in the finale of the ninth story arc.

Fiona Staples designed Marko and his family to appear Asian, having used a handful of Japanese models and actors as reference when finalizing their designs. Responding to perceptions of them as Caucasian, Staples has stated, "I can see why people sometimes mistake him for white, because I avoided using exaggerated racial markers (slanted eyes, rounded nose, etc.). With simple cartoon drawings like these, a lot is left to the reader's imagination. So I accept there will be some misidentification because I didn't draw Marko's family like Mulan characters."

Hazel
The daughter of the two lead characters, born in the first issue, who occasionally narrates the series. She has wings like her mother, horns like her father, and green-brown eyes unlike those of either of her parents. She spends most of her childhood growing up in the organic tree-like rocketship with which she and her parents escape Cleave. She is seen taking her first steps at the end of the third story arc, and is speaking in simple phrases by the beginning of the fourth. She celebrates her fourth birthday in the sixth story arc, during a part of her life when she and her grandmother are being held in a Landfallian detention center.

Izabel
Izabel is the ghost of a teenage girl from the planet Cleave who was killed by a landmine. She manifests as a reddish torso with her intestines hanging out from under the hem of her T-shirt. She comes from a family of resistance fighters who built tunnels to escape people who invaded Cleave. She makes a deal with Alana to save Marko's life in exchange for being taken with them when they leave the planet, but to do so has to bond her soul to Hazel's. Although Alana is initially reluctant to allow this, she finally relents and soon comes to appreciate Izabel's presence since she can act as a "babysitter" at night and allow Alana and Marko to rest. She has the ability to create realistic illusions with which she can disguise her appearance, although these do not work on machines such as the Robots.

Klara
Marko's mother, who first appears with Marko's father at the end of Chapter #6. Her mother died in an incident at Langencamp at the hands of Landfallians, and thus Klara is less accepting of Marko and Alana's relationship. Brian K. Vaughan, when asked which character was his favorite, stated that Klara was the easiest to write.

Ghüs
Ghüs (pronounced "goose") is a bipedal humanoid resembling a harp seal. who first appears in Chapter 12 as a herder on Quietus, near D. Oswald Heist's lighthouse, who tends to a herd of four-legged walrus-like animals. Members of Ghüs' tribe harbor a link to their animals, which allow them to follow one of their herd when it goes missing, to a limited extent, which Ghüs uses to help Marko and Prince Robot IV find Alana, Hazel, and Squire after they are kidnapped by Dengo. After successfully completing this mission, Ghüs helps Prince Robot IV raise his son, Squire on Quietus, where he proves himself a formidable guardian against threats to the boy. Ghüs was entirely the creation of Fiona Staples, having appeared among the designs Staples showed to Vaughan in between story arcs. Vaughan has commented, "I knew he'd become a major part of our narrative the second I saw her first sketch of him."

Upsher and Doff
Upsher and Doff are a tabloid journalist and photographer, respectively, from the planet Jetsam, who work for a tabloid called The Hebdomadal, and who are lovers. First appearing in Chapter 13, their speech, like all people from Jetsam, is rendered in the form of green text surrounded by speech balloons that more closely resemble traditional comics thought bubbles. Jetsam is a partially underwater society, as its natives possess an amphibious physiology, and are capable of surviving in and out of water. Upsher and Doff experience more than one confrontation with Freelancers hired to put an end to their investigation. The Brand poisons them with embargon, a substance that will kill them if they report their findings about the family to anyone else, though they attempt to find a way around this in order to continue their investigation. After they learn The Brand is dead, they attempt to resume their investigation, but are confronted by The Will, who forces them into his service. They are freed from captivity in Chapter 36, and by Chapter 49, become allied with the family. Doff is killed by Ianthe in Chapter 51, and by Chapter 66, Upsher and Ghüs have taken residence at D. Oswald Heist's rebuilt lighthouse.

=== The family's pursuers ===
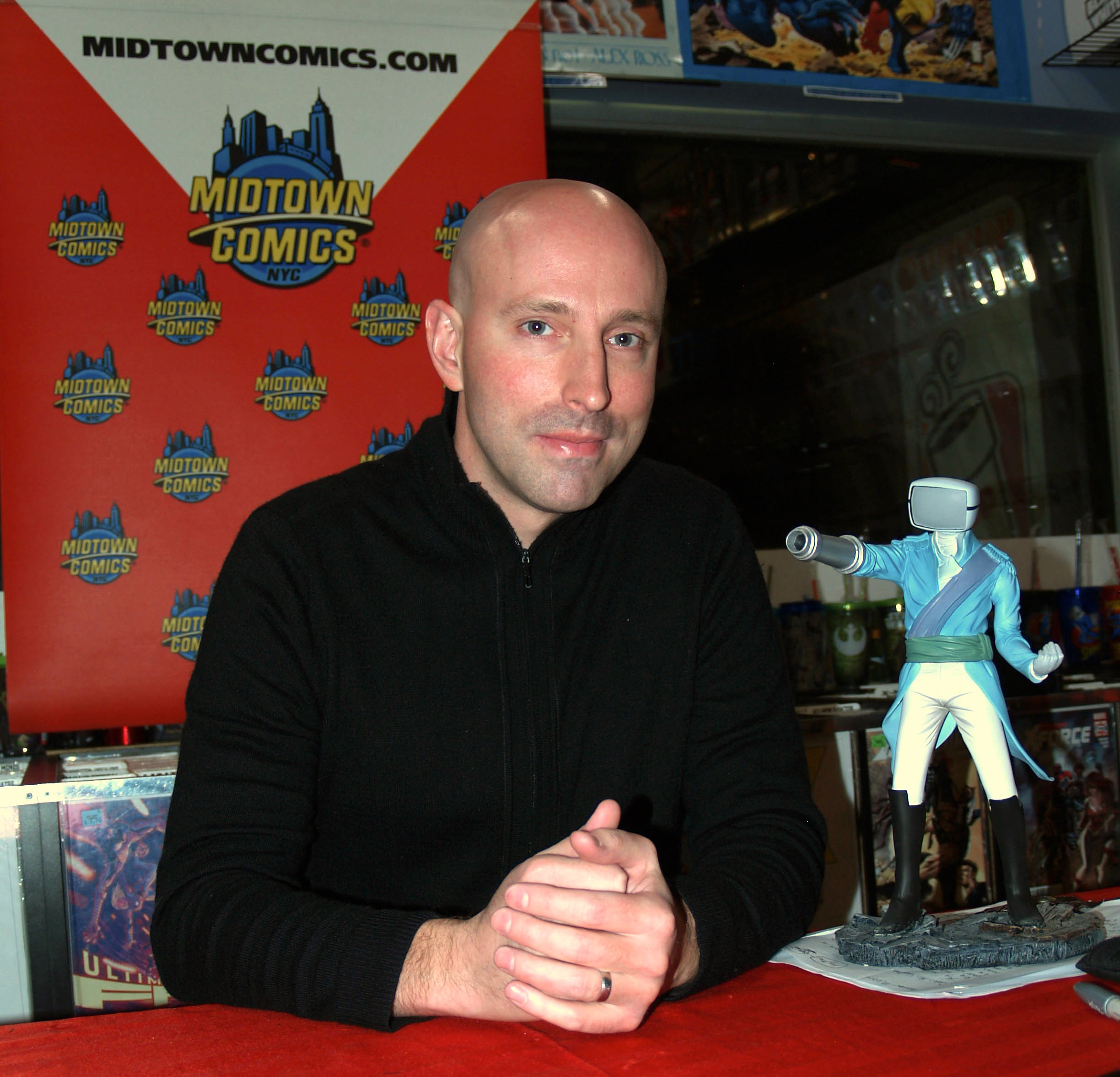
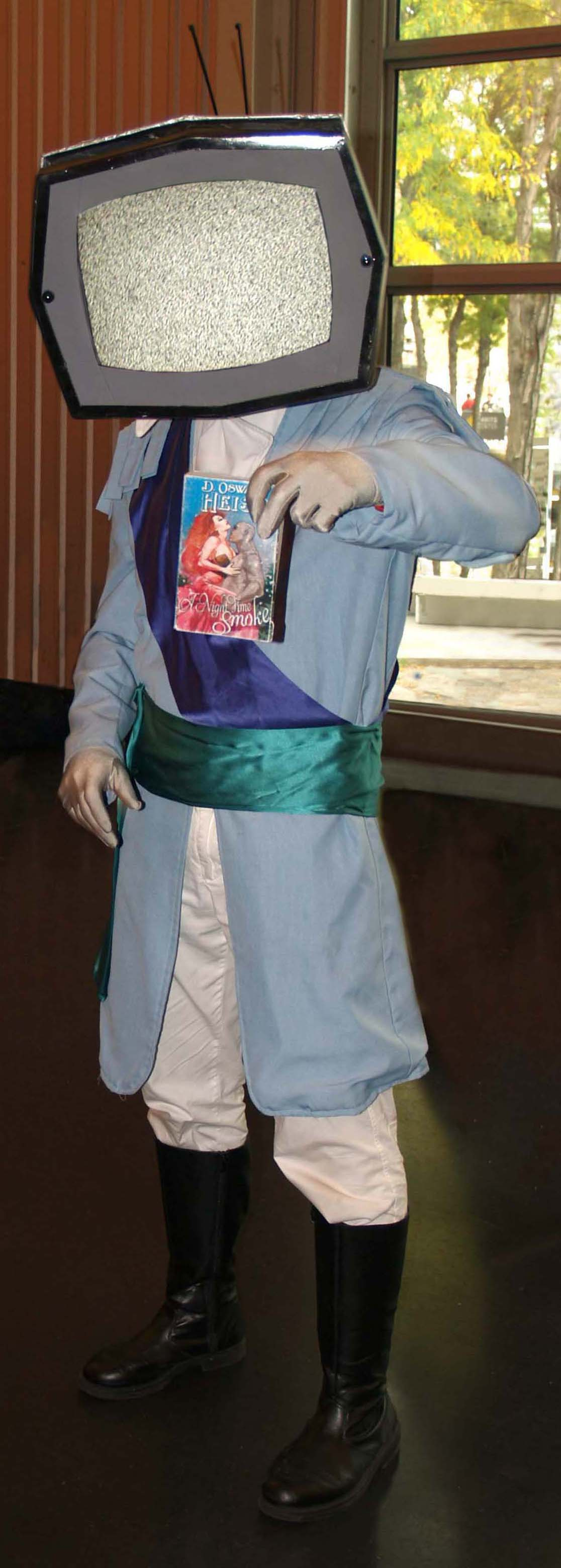
At left, series creator Brian K. Vaughan with a fan-made figurine of Prince Robot IV that was given to him as a gift at a signing at Midtown Comics in Manhattan. At right, a cosplayer dressed as the character at the 2014 New York Comic Con. He is holding a facsimile of A Nighttime Smoke.

Prince Robot IV
A member of the royal family of the Robot Kingdom, assigned by Landfall as their primary pursuer of Alana and Marko in the beginning of the series when his wife is pregnant with their first child. Like others of his race, he is a humanoid with a small television set for a head, which Vaughan explains is influenced by a fascination with old televisions that he developed when he began writing for TV. He also has blue blood and the ability to morph his right arm into a cannon. In the beginning of the series, Prince Robot IV has just returned from a "two–year tour of hell" after which he had to be given a new leg following a brutal sneak attack. His brain "reboots" after he is injured confronting the family in the third story arc and he is still missing when his son is born in the fourth story arc. He is decapitated in the ninth story arc by The Will.

The Will
One of the freelance bounty hunters hired by the Wreath High Command to kill Marko and Alana and bring Hazel back alive, not only for Marko's betrayal but also to prevent news of Alana and Marko's coupling from spreading and thus threatening troop morale. The Will is accompanied by a Lying Cat, a large talking feline that can detect lies. Vez, the woman who hires him, says she hired The Will because he shares Marko's moral relativism. When he travels to the sexually permissive planet Sextillion and is presented with a six-year-old sexual slave girl, The Will kills her pimp. The Will was once the lover of The Stalk, a female spider-like bounty hunter who is also assigned to Alana and Marko until she is killed by Prince Robot IV, for which The Will vows revenge. He develops an attraction to Gwendolyn even as he mourns The Stalk. His sister Sophie, who addresses him as "Billy", and who introduced him to The Stalk, is another Freelancer who works under the name The Brand. In the third story arc, he decides to abandon his Freelancer life, but suffers a traumatic near-fatal injury from which a doctor says he will likely never fully recover.

Lying Cat
Lying Cat is a large female talking feline companion to The Will who aids him in his work. Green in color with yellow stripes, she has the ability to detect when a verbal statement is a lie, which she indicates by saying "Lying". Her power is limited to the state of the mind of the person speaking: she can detect deliberate deception, but cannot detect a falsehood if a given statement is believed to be true by the speaker. According to Izabel, Lying Cats always play by the rules, an allusion to the fact that a Lying Cat must also admit ethical truths as well as factual ones. When Gwendolyn, who becomes Lying Cat's ally, accidentally kills a man, Izabel says that they had no right to execute that man in his home, which Lying Cat cannot deny. It has been revealed that Lying Cat was the runt of her seven-kitten litter, a fact whose revelation causes her distress.

Sophie
Sophie is introduced as a six-and-a-half-year-old former sex slave, initially known only as Slave Girl, that The Will discovers on the pleasure planet Sextillion. He and Gwendolyn rescue her, after which the girl reveals she possesses the power of psychometry, with which she helps The Will track Marko and Alana. The Will decides to name her Sophie in Chapter 13, which is the same name as his sister. She dies in Chapter 65 after taking a poisoned arrow intended for The Will. Vaughan has stated that Sophie was created to illustrate the horrific effects of war and as a critique of the sexualized portrayal of Princess Leia as Jabba the Hutt's slave in the film Star Wars: Return of the Jedi, explaining, "That's that character at her least sexy. There are slave girls in the world and they don't look like Princess Leia in a bikini."

Gwendolyn
Marko's former fiancée, who joins The Will's pursuit of the family. Gwendolyn first appears at the end of Chapter #8, having been assigned by the Secretary General of Wreath High Command to check on The Will and helps him rescue Slave Girl from Sextillion in order to spur him to complete his mission. Marko and Alana's wedding rings, which also function as translator devices, were originally those of Gwendolyn's grandparents, who had the rings enchanted with a translator spell because they spoke two different dialects of Wreath's native language. She wears her grandparents' translation pendant around her neck, which was forged with the rings as part of the same set. She resists The Will's advances, though she reveals she loves him while attempting to get medical attention for him after he suffers a near-fatal injury.

== Reception ==
=== Sales and reprints ===
The first chapter sold out of its first printing ahead of its March 14 release date. A second printing ordered for April 11, the same release date as Chapter 2, also sold out, with a third printing arriving in stores on April 25. The issue ultimately went through five printings. By August it had sold over 70,000 copies in various printings. As of 2016, the collected editions of the series outsell those of The Walking Dead, another successful Image comic that has greater public visibility through the television series adapted from it.

The first trade paperback collection, Saga, Vol. 1, which collects the first six issues, was published October 10, 2012, and appeared at Number 6 on the New York Times Graphic Books Best Seller list the week of October 29. As of August 2013, it had sold 120,000 copies.

Although Chapter #7 sold out, Image Comics PR & Marketing Director Jennifer deGuzman announced in a December 12, 2012 letter to retailers that it would not reprint select comics, such as that issue. DeGuzman explained the move as a result of decreasing orders on well-performing titles like Saga, despite critical acclaim and consistently selling out at a distributor level, and pointed to orders on Saga #8, which decreased 4% from orders on Chapter #7. Rather than invest in second printings, deGuzman explained, Image would instead focus its attention on ensuring that the first printing garners the sales desired. This move displeased some retailers, which prompted Image Publisher Eric Stephenson to announce the following day that Image would indeed publish a second printing of Chapter #7 at a considerable discount, but cautioned that the publisher would not be able to reprint every chapter of the series indefinitely, and implored retailers not to under-order the series.

The second trade paperback collection immediately appeared at the top of the New York Times graphic books best-seller list.

=== Critical reception ===
The series was met with wide critical acclaim and is one of the most celebrated American comics being published (as of October 2018). It holds an average score of 9.0 out of 10 at the review aggregator website Comic Book Roundup. This score is held by both the regular series and the collected volumes.

The first chapter was widely acclaimed in publications such as Publishers Weekly, MTV, Ain't it Cool News, Complex magazine, Comic Book Resources, iFanboy and ComicsAlliance; they all praised Vaughan's ability to incorporate elements of different genres, establishing the vast setting and mythology, and introducing characters that engaged the reader. Multiple reviewers likened the book to a combination of sci-fi/fantasy works such as Star Wars and The Lord of the Rings and classic works of literature such as Romeo and Juliet, Hamlet and the New Testament. AICN singled-out the use of the newborn Hazel as a lone individual to chronicle large-scale events from a past perspective, and Alex Zalben of MTV Geek remarking that he could hear a John Williams score as he read the book. Multiple reviewers also lauded Vaughan for beginning the story with Hazel's birth rather than hurting the story's pace with copious exposition of Alana and Marko's initial meeting and courtship. Todd Allen of The Beat approved of the book's unique "flavor", singling out the characters' motivations, the immersiveness of its surrealist setting, the strangeness of the story's various oddities and the timely nature of the story's political undertones. Both Alex Evans of Weekly Comic Book Review and P. S. Hayes of Geeks of Doom called the series a "classic"; Hayes also praised Image Comics for publishing such an "original" series. Also widely praised was Fiona Staples' artwork, which was characterized as "glorious", with Zalben predicting that readers would "fall head over heels in love" with it, and Greg McElhatton of Comic Book Resources positively comparing it to that of Leinil Francis Yu, specifically her use of delicate lines to frame characters with large, bold figures and Staples' mixture of the familiar and the foreign together in her character designs to create a visually cohesive universe. AICN singled out Staples' handling of grand, sweeping space shots and other genre trappings, as well as her mastery of facial expressions – which AICN felt was perfectly suited to Vaughan's subtle dialogue. Todd Allen of The Beat wrote that Staples' landscapes at times play as much a part in the story as the foreground.

The subsequent issues that made up the series' initial six-issue story arc also garnered similarly positive reviews, with three printings ordered for Chapter #2, and second printings ordered for issues 3 – 6. The series was included in IGN's 2012 list of "The Comics We're Thankful For This Year" and took the #1 spot in CBR's "Top 10 Comics of 2012". In August 2013, Douglas Wolk of Time magazine referred to the series as a "breakout hit", calling it "mischievous, vulgar and gloriously inventive."

Joseph McCabe of The Nerdist included the hardcover Saga Deluxe Edition Volume 1 in that site's Top 5 Comic Reprint Collections of 2014. That same year, Laura Sneddon of the British Science Fiction Association's journal Vector listed Saga among her list of six groundbreaking science fiction comics.

=== Awards ===
In 2013 Saga won the three Eisner Awards it was nominated for: Best Continuing Series, Best New Series and Best Writer. That same year, the Vol. 1 trade paperback won the 2013 Hugo Award for Best Graphic Story. The series was also nominated for seven 2013 Harvey Awards and won six of those: Best Writer, Best Artist, Best Color, Best New Series, Best Continuing or Limited Series, and Best Single Issue or Story.

In 2014 the series won all three Eisners that it was nominated for: Best Painter/Multimedia Artist, Best Writer, and Best Continuing Series.

In 2015 the series was again nominated for the same three Eisner Awards it won the previous year and won two of them: Best Continuing Series and Best Penciller/Inker. That same year the fourth volume was awarded the Goodreads Choice Award for Graphic Novels & Comics in 2015.

Year	Award	Category	Nominee	Result	Ref.
2013	Eisner Awards	Best Continuing Series	Saga	Won	
2013	Eisner Awards	Best New Series	Saga	Won	
2013	Eisner Awards	Best Writer	Brian K. Vaughan	Won	
2013	Harvey Awards	Best Writer	Brian K. Vaughan	Won	
2013	Harvey Awards	Best Artist	Fiona Staples	Won	
2013	Harvey Awards	Best Colorist	Fiona Staples	Won	
2013	Harvey Awards	Best New Series	Saga	Won	
2013	Harvey Awards	Best Continuing or Limited Series	Saga	Won	
2013	Harvey Awards	Best Single Issue or Story	Saga #1	Won	
2013	Harvey Awards	Best Cover Artist	Fiona Staples	Nominated	
2013	Hugo Awards	Best Graphic Story	Saga, Volume One	Won	
2013	British Fantasy Awards	Best Comic/Graphic Novel	Saga	Won	
2013	Joe Shuster Awards	Cover Artist	Fiona Staples	Nominated	
2013	Joe Shuster Awards	Artist	Saga #1-8	Nominated	
2014	Eisner Awards	Best Continuing Series	Saga	Won	
2014	Eisner Awards	Best Writer	Brian K. Vaughan	Won	
2014	Eisner Awards	Best Painter/Multimedia Artist	Fiona Staples	Won	
2014	Eisner Awards	Best Cover Artist	Fiona Staples	Nominated	
2014	Harvey Awards	Best Continuing Series	Saga	Won	
2014	Harvey Awards	Best Writer	Brian K. Vaughan	Won	
2014	Harvey Awards	Best Artist	Fiona Staples	Won	
2014	Harvey Awards	Best Cover Artist	Fiona Staples	Won	
2014	Hugo Awards	Best Graphic Story	Saga, Volume Two	Nominated	
2014	Joe Shuster Awards	Artist	Fiona Staples	Won	
2014	Inkwell Awards	All-in-One Award	Fiona Staples	Nominated	
2015	Eisner Awards	Best Continuing Series	Saga	Won	
2015	Eisner Awards	Best Writer	Brian K. Vaughan	Nominated	
2015	Eisner Awards	Best Painter/Multimedia Artist	Fiona Staples	Won	
2015	Harvey Awards	Best Continuing Series	Saga	Won	
2015	Harvey Awards	Best Writer	Brian K. Vaughan	Nominated	
2015	Harvey Awards	Best Artist	Fiona Staples	Won	
2015	Harvey Awards	Best Cover Artist	Fiona Staples	Won	
2015	Hugo Awards	Best Graphic Story	Saga, Volume Three	Nominated	
2015	Inkwell Awards	All-in-One Award	Fiona Staples	Won	
2016	Harvey Awards	Best Continuing or Limited Series	Saga	Won	
2016	Harvey Awards	Best Writer	Brian K. Vaughan	Won	
2016	Harvey Awards	Best Artist	Fiona Staples	Won	
2016	Harvey Awards	Best Cover Artist	Fiona Staples	Won	
2016	Inkwell Awards	All-in-One Award	Fiona Staples	Nominated	
2017	Eisner Awards	Best Continuing Series	Saga	Won	
2017	Eisner Awards	Best Writer	Brian K. Vaughan	Won	
2017	Eisner Awards	Best Penciler/Inker or Penciler/Inker Team	Fiona Staples	Won	
2017	Eisner Awards	Best Cover Artist	Fiona Staples	Won	
2017	Hugo Awards	Best Graphic Story	Saga, Volume Six	Nominated	
2017	Ringo Award	Best Artist or Penciller	Fiona Staples	Won	
2018	Hugo Awards	Best Graphic Story	Saga, Volume Seven	Nominated	
2019	Hugo Awards	Best Graphic Story	Saga, Volume Nine	Nominated	
2023	Hugo Awards	Best Graphic Story	Saga, Volume Ten	Nominated	
2024	Hugo Awards	Best Graphic Story	Saga, Volume Eleven	Won	

=== Censorship ===
On April 9, 2013, media reported that Apple Inc. had prohibited the sale of Chapter 12 of Saga through iOS, because two panels that depicted oral sex between men in a small, in-set image violated Apple's restrictions on sexual content. This resulted in criticism by artists and writers, who pointed to similarly explicit content in previous issues and in other works sold through iTunes. William Gibson and others suggested that the restriction could have occurred specifically because the drawings in question depicted gay sex. A day later, digital distributor Comixology announced that it had been that company, not Apple, who had chosen not to make the chapter available based on their interpretation of Apple's rules, and that after receiving clarification from Apple, the chapter would now be sold via iOS.

In 2014, the series was included on the American Library Association's list of the ten most frequently challenged books that year. It had been challenged for containing nudity and offensive language and for being "anti-family, ... sexually explicit, and unsuited for age group."

== Merchandising ==
In 2015, Skybound Entertainment began taking pre-orders for an 8" tall, hand-painted Lying Cat resin statue, which retails for $75.

In February 2016, Essential Sequential began taking orders for a posable, 19-inch tall plushy Lying Cat doll that says, "Lying" when its collar is pressed, scheduled to ship that May. Later that June, Skybound announced that at the following month's San Diego Comic-Con, it would debut action figures based on the two lead characters, Alana and Marko, by McFarlane Toys. The five-inch figures are issued together in a two-pack, and are paired with a mace and a sword. The company also teamed with Yesterdays, a Southern California collectible enamel pin company, to produce Skybound's first ever pin set, which includes two pins of Lying Cat and a pin of Ghüs, also to debut at that Comic-Con. The Ghüs pin is priced at $10.00, and the Lying Cat set at $15.00, and both were limited to 1000 units each.

In October 2017, Image Comics announced the introduction of Pop! Vinyl figures of Lying Cat, Alana, Marko, Izabel, Prince Robot IV and The Will from Funko and Skybound Entertainment, available in February 2018.

== In other media ==
Although interest has been expressed in adapting Saga for film or TV, Vaughan and Staples reaffirmed their desire not to do so in an August 2013 interview, with Vaughan stating that the point of Saga as he conceived it was "to do absolutely everything I couldn't do in a movie or a TV show. I'm really happy with it just being a comic." Vaughan has stated that they are open to the possibility, though it is not a priority for them. However, merchandise based on the series has been produced, including a line of T-shirts featuring Lying Cat, which have become visible in popular media. In "Pac-Man Fever", the April 24, 2013 episode of the American TV series Supernatural, the character Charlie Bradbury (played by Felicia Day) is seen wearing a Lying Cat T-shirt. Day, who has referred to Saga as the "best comic EVER", indicated that show writer Robbie Thompson picked out the shirt.

The controversial cover of the comic's first chapter was referenced in "The Meemaw Materialization", the February 4, 2016 episode of the American TV sitcom The Big Bang Theory. In the episode, Claire (Alessandra Torresani) is reading the first trade paperback of the series (which features the same cover as its first issue), and Raj Koothrappali (Kunal Nayyar) observes that "not a lot of comics have a woman with wings breastfeeding a baby right on the cover." Though The Big Bang Theory is often criticized for its portrayal of comic book fans, according to Comic Book Resources, a Twitter search indicated reaction to the scene by fans of Saga readers who saw it was mostly positive.

== Collected editions ==
Title	Contents	Pages	Release	ISBN
Trade Paperbacks
Saga Vol. 1	Saga #1–6	160	Oct 10, 2012	978-1-60706-601-9
Saga Vol. 2	Saga #7–12	144	Jul 2, 2013	978-1-60706-692-7
Saga Vol. 3	Saga #13–18	144	Mar 25, 2014	978-1-60706-931-7
Saga Vol. 4	Saga #19–24	144	Dec 17, 2014	978-1-63215-077-6
Saga Vol. 5	Saga #25–30	152	Sep 30, 2015	978-1-63215-438-5
Saga Vol. 6	Saga #31–36	152	Jul 29, 2016	978-1-63215-711-9
Saga Vol. 7	Saga #37–42	152	Mar 29, 2017	978-1-5343-0060-6
Saga Vol. 8	Saga #43–48	152	Feb 2, 2018	978-1-5343-0349-2
Saga Vol. 9	Saga #49–54	152	Sep 19, 2018	978-1-5343-0837-4
Saga Vol. 10	Saga #55–60	160	Oct 11, 2022	978-1-5343-2334-6
Saga Vol. 11	Saga #61–66	160	Nov 29, 2023	978-1-5343-9913-6
Saga Vol. 12	Saga #67−72	160	Apr 30, 2025	978-1-5343-5533-0
Digests
Saga Vol. 1	Saga #1–6	160	Oct 23, 2024	978-1-5343-7054-8
Saga Vol. 2	Saga #7–12	144	Apr 16, 2025	978-1-5343-4254-5
Saga Vol. 3	Saga #13–18	144	Oct 22, 2025	978-1-5343-3480-9
Deluxe hardcovers
Saga Book One	Saga #1–18	504	Nov 19, 2014	978-1-63215-078-3
Saga Book Two	Saga #19–36	464	Apr 19, 2017	978-1-63215-903-8
Saga Book Three	Saga #37–54	504	Apr 4, 2019	978-1-5343-1221-0
Saga Book Four	Saga #55–72	504	Jun 30, 2026	978-1-5343-3260-7
Compendium
Saga Compendium One	Saga #1–54	1,328	Aug 27, 2019	978-1-5343-1346-0
