= Fiona Staples =

Canadian comic book artist

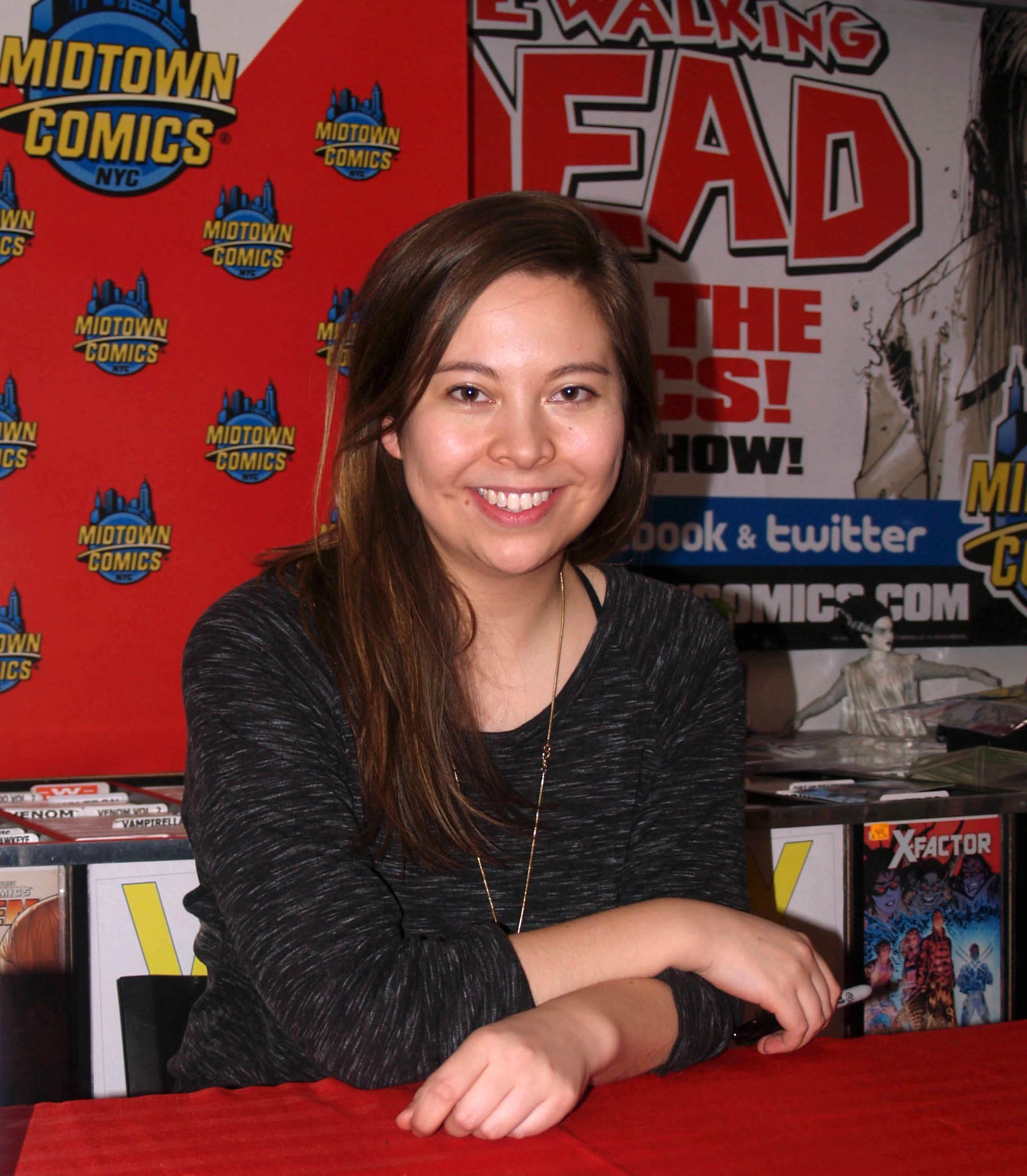
- Staples at a signing at Midtown Comics in Manhattan
- Born: Calgary, Alberta
- Areas: Penciller, Inker, Letterer, Colorist
- Notable works: Saga; DV8: Gods and Monsters; Nemesis: Reloaded; T.H.U.N.D.E.R. Agents; Archie
- Awards: Joe Shuster Award; Eisner Award; Harvey Award; Inkwell Award; Ringo Award
- Spouse: Ben Rankel

Fiona Staples is a Canadian comic book artist known for her work on books such as North 40, DV8: Gods and Monsters, T.H.U.N.D.E.R. Agents, Archie, and Saga. She has been described as one of the best artists working in the industry today. She has won multiple Eisner and Harvey Awards.

== Early life ==
Staples was born in Calgary, Alberta. She attended the Alberta College of Art and Design.

Books that have had a seminal impact upon Staples include The Princess and the Goblin by George MacDonald, Dragon of the Lost Sea series by Laurence Yep, the Redwall series by Brian Jacques, and The Chronicles of Narnia books by C. S. Lewis.

== Career ==
Staples's first published work was "Amphibious Nightmare", a 24-hour comic included in the About Comics anthology 24 Hour Comics Day Highlights 2005. Her first series assignment was 2006's Done to Death, working with writer Andrew Foley for Markosia. She was one of the illustrators of WildStorm's Trick 'r Treat graphic novel, an adaptation of the Michael Dougherty film. She was the penciller and inker of The Secret History of the Authority: Hawksmoor, written by Mike Costa. She also coloured Frazer Irving's art for the 2000 AD story Button Man.

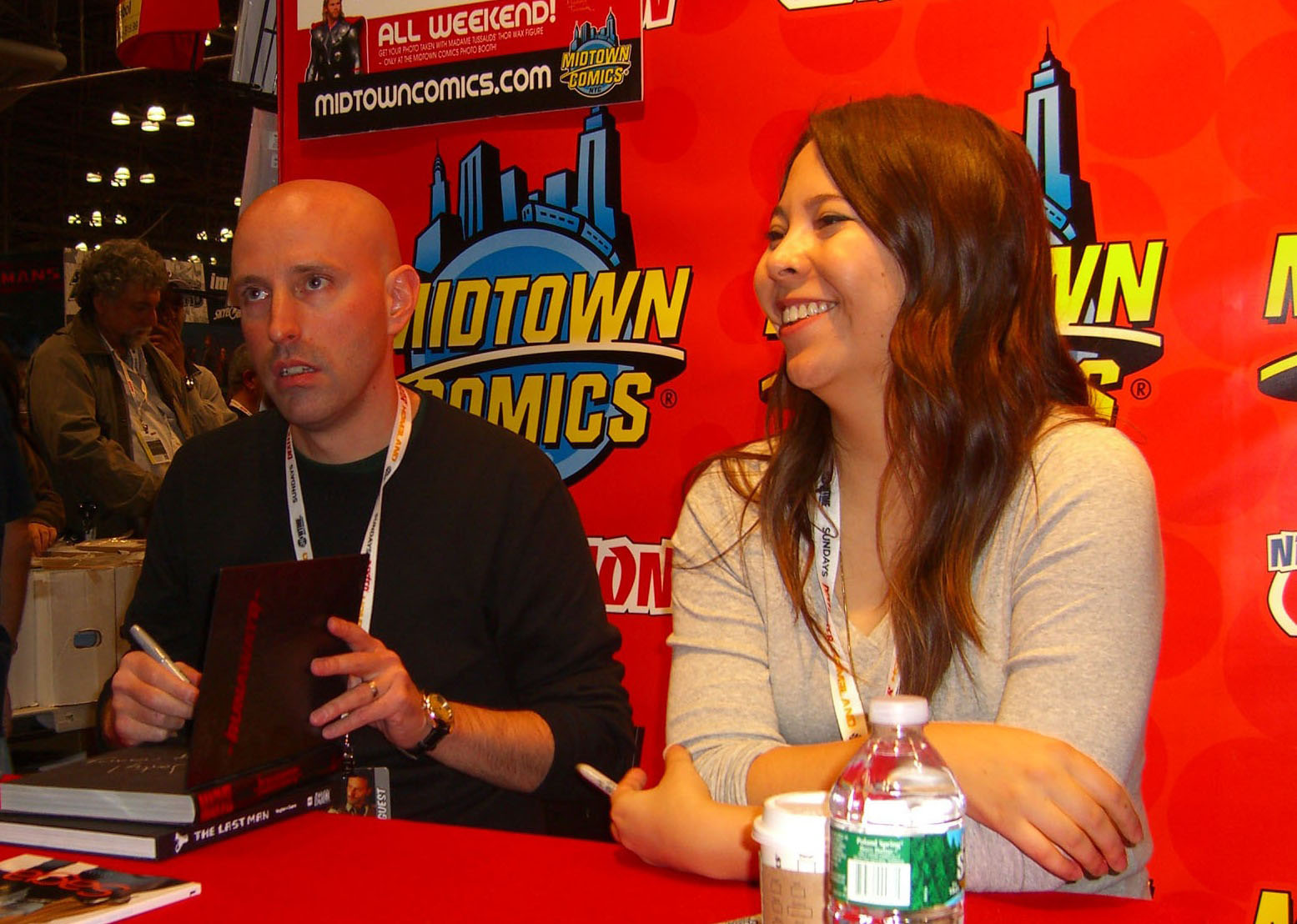
Staples and Brian K. Vaughan at the Midtown Comics booth at the 2012 New York Comic Con

In March 2012 Image Comics published the first issue of Saga, an ongoing series conceived by writer Brian K. Vaughan. Staples was introduced to Vaughan by their mutual friend, writer Steve Niles, with whom Staples worked on Mystery Society. Vaughan, who had not met Staples in person until just before their panel at the 2011 San Diego Comic-Con, explained his selection of Staples by describing his reaction upon first seeing her work, saying, "Her artwork is incredible. [It] doesn't look like anyone else. She is very unique. When I opened up this file I was like, 'This is going to work!'" Staples is co-owner of Saga, and designed the cast, the ships, and the alien races in the story. She also provides painted covers, and hand-letters the narration (using her own handwriting), which is the final work she does after finishing the artwork on a page.

In 2015, Staples and writer Mark Waid became the creative team for the opening three-issue story arc of Archie Comics' relaunched Archie, in celebration of the character's 75th anniversary. Staples, who had previously provided variant covers for the publisher, contributed her distinctive drawing style, rather than Archie's house style, and designed "a new look and an edgier tone" for the Archie comic book, whose storylines will portray the character in darker, more complicated situations, though not necessarily for a strictly adult audience.

== Technique and materials ==
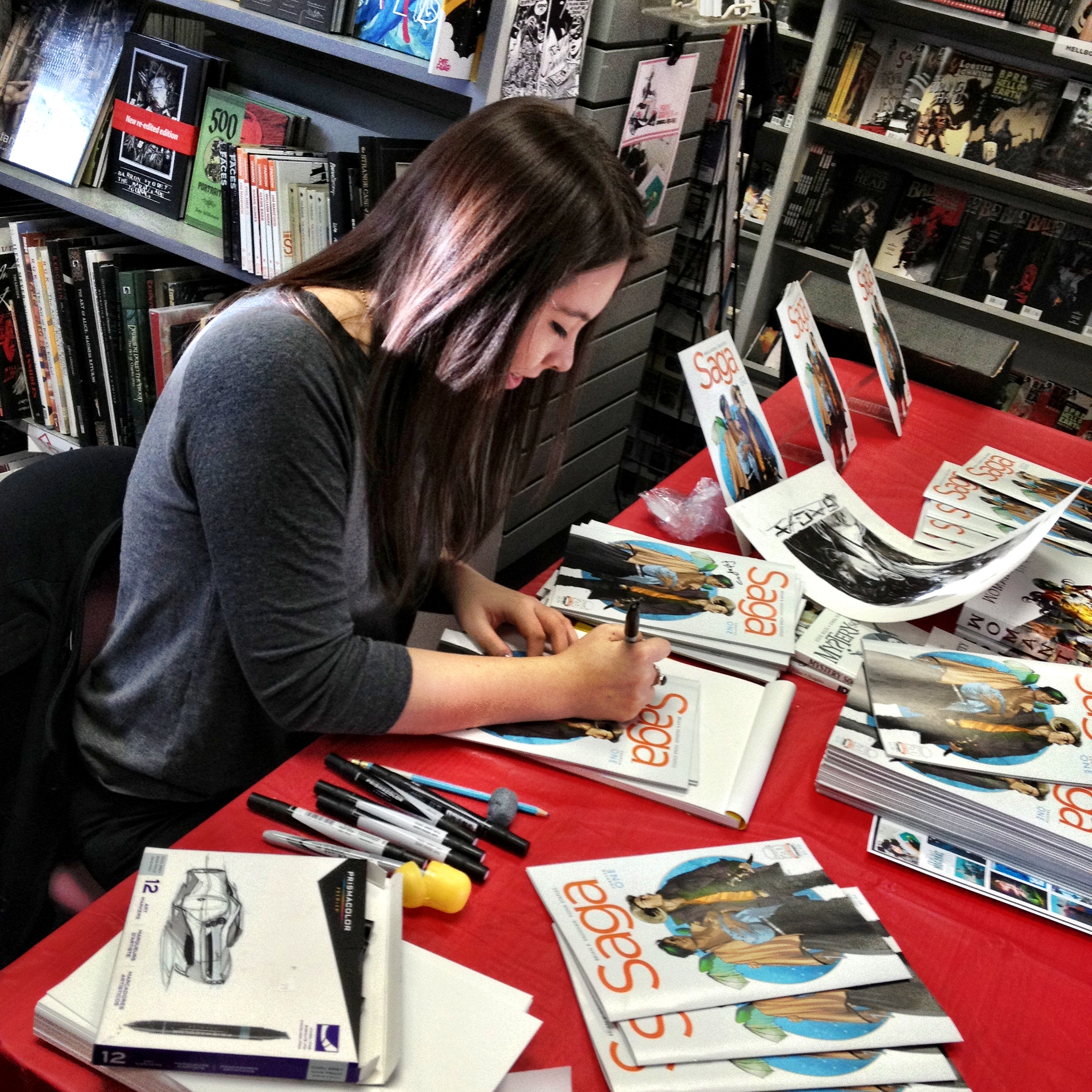
Staples at Another Dimension Comics in Calgary, Alberta, Canada

At the beginning of her career, Staples would scan traditional drawings in and edit them in Adobe Photoshop later. Staples began creating her artwork entirely digitally several years before she began work on Saga, though her process for that series is different from previous ones, for which she characterizes it as "one intense, ongoing experiment." She begins with thumbnails, roughly drawn on printed paper templates. During this stage Staples gives copious thought to the layouts and staging, making it, in her words, the most important part of the process. After scanning the thumbnails, she enlarges them and uses them as rudimentary pencils, and "inks" over them in Manga Studio. She has said that her art distributor is "perpetually disappointed in her," as fans would pay high prices for inks and pencils.

One of the advantages Staples sees in working digitally is the ability to dispense with tight pencils in favor of making corrections in an ad hoc manner, as she finds that penciling in great detail, and re-drawing such artwork a second time in ink, to be boring. In Saga, Staples inks only the figures in pen-and-ink, using a lot of self-shot photo references to finalize the poses, which she does not use in the thumbnail stage. She then imports the art into Photoshop, which she uses to paint the backgrounds entirely in colour, to achieve a look inspired by video games and Japanese animation. At the 2012 Image Expo, Staples described the process by which she produces the art as harkening back to animation cels, in which emphasis is placed on figures and backgrounds. The process, according to Staples, can be time-consuming, depending on the complexity of the environment.

For outdoor environments, she begins by selecting a colour palette and initially blocking in the shapes roughly. She subsequently colours the figures, using flat colours both to make the process quicker and because she feels that painted figures in comics can often look "stiff" and difficult for the reader to "read" quickly. For pages that feature narration by the character Hazel, Staples writes the text using her own handwriting. Vaughan has stated that Staples's style has influenced the direction of the story. The organic forms of most of the series' technology, for example, such as the main characters' wooden rocket ship, is derived from Staples's dislike of drawing mechanical objects. To design the series' various planetary settings, Staples looks to the real world for inspiration and then exaggerates some elements of them. Some rooms on the planet Cleave, for example, were inspired by Cambodian architecture.

== Critical reception ==
Staples's work on Saga received wide acclaim from numerous reviewers, with Ain't it Cool News characterizing it as "glorious", and P.S. Hayes of Geeks of Doom praising her art as "amazing", saying, "From the gorgeous painted cover all the way through the last page, she delivers in every way that's artistically possible. It's got to be tough to be handed a script like this one and try and figure out what to do, but she handles it beautifully. Everything looks like it belongs in the universe. Her backgrounds are elaborate, yet never distracting or too busy and they never take focus off the main characters."

Alex Zalben of MTV Geek predicted readers would "fall head over heels in love" with it, and Greg McElhatton of Comic Book Resources positively compared it to that of Leinil Francis Yu, specifically her use of delicate lines to frame characters with large, bold figures, and her mixture of the familiar and the foreign together in her character designs to create a visually cohesive universe. AICN singled out Staples's handling of grand, sweeping space shots and other genre trappings, as well as her mastery of facial expressions, which AICN felt was perfectly suited to Vaughan's subtle dialogue.

In 2015, Staples was voted the #1 female comic book artist of all time by readers of Comic Book Resources.

== Awards and nominations ==
Year	Award	Category	Work	Result	Ref.
2010	Eisner Awards	Best Penciller/Inker or Penciller/Inker Team	North 40	Nominated	
2011	Joe Shuster Award	Outstanding Comic Book Cover Artist	Mystery Society #1-5, DV8: Gods and Monsters #1-8, Superman/Batman #79, Acts of Violence: An Anthology of Crime Comics, Magus #1	Won	
2011	Joe Shuster Award	Outstanding Comic Book Artist	Mystery Society #1-5, Northlanders #29, Fringe: Tales from the Fringe #4	Nominated	
2013	Hugo Award	Best Graphic Story	Saga, Vol. 1 (with Brian K. Vaughan)	Won	
2013	Eisner Awards	Best New Series	Saga (with Brian K. Vaughan)	Won	
2013	Eisner Awards	Best Continuing Series	Saga (with Brian K. Vaughan)	Won	
2013	Harvey Award	Best Artist	Saga	Won	
2013	Harvey Award	Best Colourist	Saga	Won	
2013	Harvey Award	Best New Series	Saga (with Brian K. Vaughan)	Won	
2013	Harvey Award	Best Continuing/Limited Series	Saga (with Brian K. Vaughan)	Won	
2013	Harvey Award	Best Issue/Story	Saga (with Brian K. Vaughan)	Won	
2013	Harvey Award	Best Cover Artist	Saga	Nominated	
2013	British Fantasy Award	Best Comic/Graphic Novel	Saga (with Brian K. Vaughan)	Won	
2013	Joe Shuster Award	Cover Artist	Life with Archie #24B, Dark Horse Presents #10, Action Comics #15B, National Comics Madame X #1, Smoke and Mirrors #1B, Saga #1-8	Nominated	
2013	Joe Shuster Award	Artist	Saga #1-8	Nominated	
2014	Hugo Award	Best Graphic Story	Saga, Vol. 2 (with Brian K. Vaughan)	Nominated	
2014	Hugo Award	Best Professional Artist		Nominated	
2014	Eisner Awards	Best Continuing Series	Saga (with Brian K. Vaughan)	Won	
2014	Eisner Awards	Best Painter/Multimedia Artist (interior art)	Saga	Won	
2014	Eisner Awards	Best Cover Artist	Saga	Nominated	
2014	Harvey Award	Best Artist	Saga	Won	
2014	Harvey Award	Best Cover Artist	Saga	Won	
2014	Harvey Award	Best Continuing or Limited Series	Saga (with Brian K. Vaughan)	Won	
2014	Joe Shuster Award	Artist	Saga	Won	
2014	Inkwell Awards	All-in-One Award	Saga, Batman Beyond	Nominated	
2015	Eisner Awards	Best Continuing Series	Saga (with Brian K. Vaughan)	Won	
2015	Eisner Awards	Best Penciller/Inker	Saga	Won	
2015	Harvey Award	Best Cover Artist	Saga	Won	
2015	Harvey Award	Best Artist	Saga	Won	
2015	Harvey Award	Best Continuing or Limited Series	Saga (with Brian K. Vaughan)	Won	
2015	Inkwell Awards	All-in-One Award	Saga	Won	
2016	Harvey Awards	Best Cover Artist	Saga	Won	
2016	Harvey Awards	Best Artist	Saga	Won	
2016	Harvey Awards	Best Continuing or Limited Series	Saga (with Brian K. Vaughan)	Won	
2016	Harvey Awards	Best New Series	Archie (with Mark Waid)	Nominated	
2016	Inkwell Awards	All-in-One Award		Nominated	
2017	Eisner Award	Best Continuing Series	Saga (with Brian K. Vaughan)	Won	
2017	Eisner Award	Best Penciller/Inker	Saga	Won	
2017	Eisner Award	Best Cover Artist	Saga	Won	
2017	Ringo Award	Best Artist or Penciller		Won	
2018	Hugo Awards	Best Graphic Story	Saga, Volume 7 (with Brian K. Vaughan)	Nominated	
2019	Ringo Awards	Best Inker		Won	
2019	Ringo Awards	Best Cover Artist		Won	

== Bibliography ==
=== Interior art ===
- 24 Hour Comics Day Highlights 2005: "Amphibious Nightmare" (self-written, About Comics, 2005)
- Done to Death (with writer Andrew Foley, 6-issue limited series, Markosia, July 2006-January 2009)
- Button Man: "Book IV: The Hitman's Daughter" (colours, with writer John Wagner and artist Frazer Irving, in 2000 AD #1551-1566, 2007)
- Proof #6-8 (colours, with writer Alexander Grecian and art by Riley Rossmo, Image Comics, March–May 2008)
- The Secret History of the Authority: Hawksmoor (with writer Mike Costa, 6-issue limited series, Wildstorm, June 2008 - March 2009)
- Tales from the Black Museum: "The Incredible Teatime Torture Show" (colours, with writer Tony Lee and art by Vince Locke, in Judge Dredd Megazine #284, May 2009)
- North 40 (with writer Aaron Williams, 6-issue limited series, Wildstorm, September 2009 - February 2010)
- Northlanders: The Sea Road (with writer Brian Wood, Vertigo, One shot, June 2010)
- Mystery Society (with writer Steve Niles, IDW Publishing, April 2010-ongoing)
- Jonah Hex #66 (with writer Jimmy Palmiotti, DC Comics, One shot, April 2011)
- Saga (with writer Brian K. Vaughan, Image Comics, ongoing, March 14, 2012 – present)
- Archie (with writer Mark Waid, Archie Comics, #1-3, 2015)

=== Cover work ===
- Sheena #2 Variant Cover (2007) #5 (2008)
- War Machine #5 (2009)
- DV8: Gods and Monsters #1-8 (2010)
- Magus #1 (2010)
- Superman/Batman #79-80 (2010)
- T.H.U.N.D.E.R. Agents #7-10 (2011)
- 30 Days of Night #1 Variant Cover (2011)
- Criminal Macabre/The Goon: When Freaks Collide One shot (2011)
- Dark Horse Presents #10 (2012)
- National Comics: Madame X #1 (2012)
- Rat Queens #1 Variant Cover (2013)
- Fire and Stone #1 Variant Cover (2014)
- Chrononauts #1 Variant Cover (2015)
- The Wicked + The Divine #11 Variant Cover (2015)
- Archie #650
- Sex Criminals #16 XXX Variant cover (2017)
- Labyrinth: Coronation #1–12 (2018-2019)
- Nemesis: Reloaded #1–5 (Image, 2023)
