= Comic Store Heroes =

American reality television program

- Genre: Reality, Unscripted
- Starring: Gerry Gladston; Thor Parker; Alex Rae
- Country of origin: United States
- Original language: English
- No. of seasons: 1
- No. of episodes: 1

Production
- Running time: 1 hour
- Production company: Parthenon Entertainment

Original release
- Network: National Geographic Channel
- Release: July 13, 2012

Comic Store Heroes is a reality television program set inside Manhattan's Midtown Comics, the largest comic bookstore in the United States. Described as a one-hour documentary about comic book subculture, it is British production company Parthenon Entertainment's first American-based factual entertainment production and premiered on the National Geographic Channel on July 13, 2012, at 8pm Eastern Standard Time. As with Comic Book Men, a similar series airing on AMC starring Kevin Smith, the program focuses on the interactions among the store's staff, and with its customers.

== Production history ==
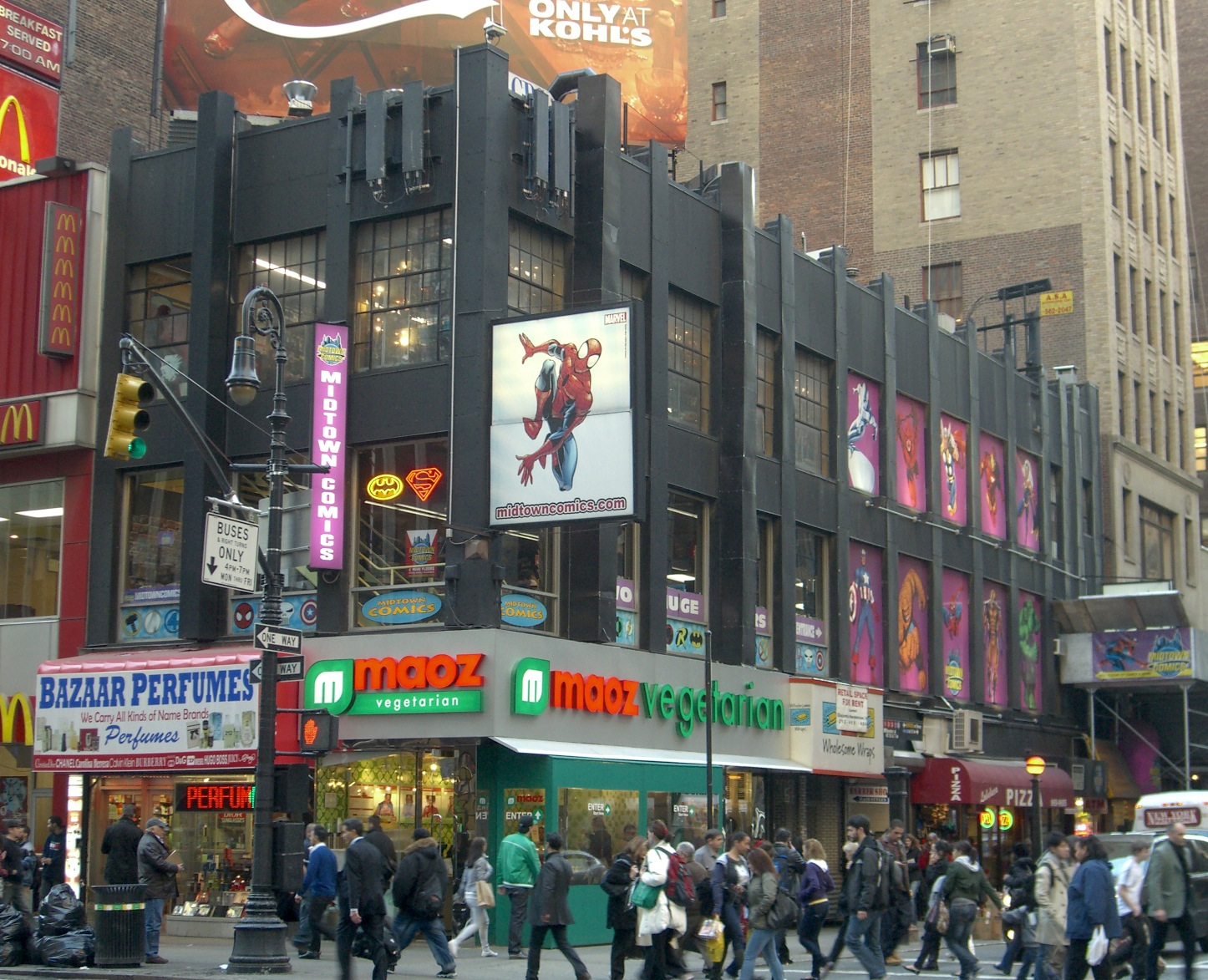
The store's Times Square branch

Comic Store Heroes is set in Midtown Comics in Manhattan, the largest comic book store in the United States. Described as a one-hour documentary about comic book subculture, the program focuses on the interactions between the devoted and sometimes obsessive comics aficionados that form the store's customer base, and the store's staff, specifically Gerry Gladston, one of the store's five co-founders, and two of his employees, marketing manager Thor Parker, and pricing expert Alex Rae. Parker and Rae's competition for Gladston's attention will constitute some of the conflict in the narratives. Other plot points will include Gladston assigning Rae the task of tracking down a difficult-to-find copy of the comic book that began his childhood love of comics, Hot Stuff: The Little Devil #1, and the store's preparation of their booth at the New York Comic Con. Customers spotlighted include comics blogger/journalist Jill Pantozzi, who was diagnosed at age 2 with spinal muscular atrophy, and interacts with others through her love of the comics medium. Another customer is Chris Notarile, a 20-something aspiring comic book creator who lives on food stamps in order to devote his money to developing his character, The Protector.

The program is British production company Parthenon Entertainment's first American-based factual entertainment production. Parthenon Director of Production Danny Tipping comments on the subject matter's appeal, "The world of comic book super fans is both fascinating and surprising. You don't have to be a fan of comic books to appreciate what some of the most devoted fans will do to make their dreams come true, and some collections are bought and sold for millions of dollars."

Regarding comparisons to Kevin Smith reality series Comic Book Men, Midtown's Parker comments, "We're fans of Kevin's show and what it brings to the table, but we wanted to take things in a different direction. We wanted to try and work [past] the typical stereotypes about comic book fans and show that comics and the comic community have the ability to help people find acceptance, become part of an extremely welcoming family, and really make a difference in people's lives."

== Cast ==
- Gerry Gladston - One of the store's five founders, and the boss in the series. His interest in comics was sparked by the 1957 comic Hot Stuff: The Little Devil #1, which he obtained at a candy shop in his native Queens when he was five years old. He assigns Alex the difficult task of tracking down a copy of that book.
- Thor Parker - The store's Social Marketing Manager and Events Director, who is in charge of arranging store events such as book signings, as well as selecting new books to put on the store's racks. Parker became interested in comics while in elementary school, through the Marvel Comics trading cards. He eventually gravitated to more independent comics, such as Daniel Clowes' David Boring and Art Spiegelman's Maus. His favorite comics today are Sandman Mystery Theatre and the work of Johnny Ryan. His dream comic to own is Adventure Comics #40, which is the 1939 first appearance of the Golden Age Sandman. Parker began working at Midtown Comics after discovering that they were hiring while visiting friends in New York City from his native Tampa, Florida. He and Alex later appeared in Episode 6 of the VH1 reality series For What It's Worth, in which they appraised Tony Moore's original artwork for Page 7 of The Walking Dead #1.
- Alex Rae - The store's pricing expert, who acquires rare books for the store. He and Thor later appeared in Episode 6 of the VH1 reality series For What It's Worth, in which they appraised Tony Moore's original artwork for Page 7 of The Walking Dead #1.
- Zoë Gulliksen - Thor's "right-hand woman", who first acquired her job at Midtown Comics after winning second place in a Midtown costume contest. She assists Thor in matters pertaining to marketing, such as conducting recorded interviews of featured comics creators during book signings.

== Plot ==
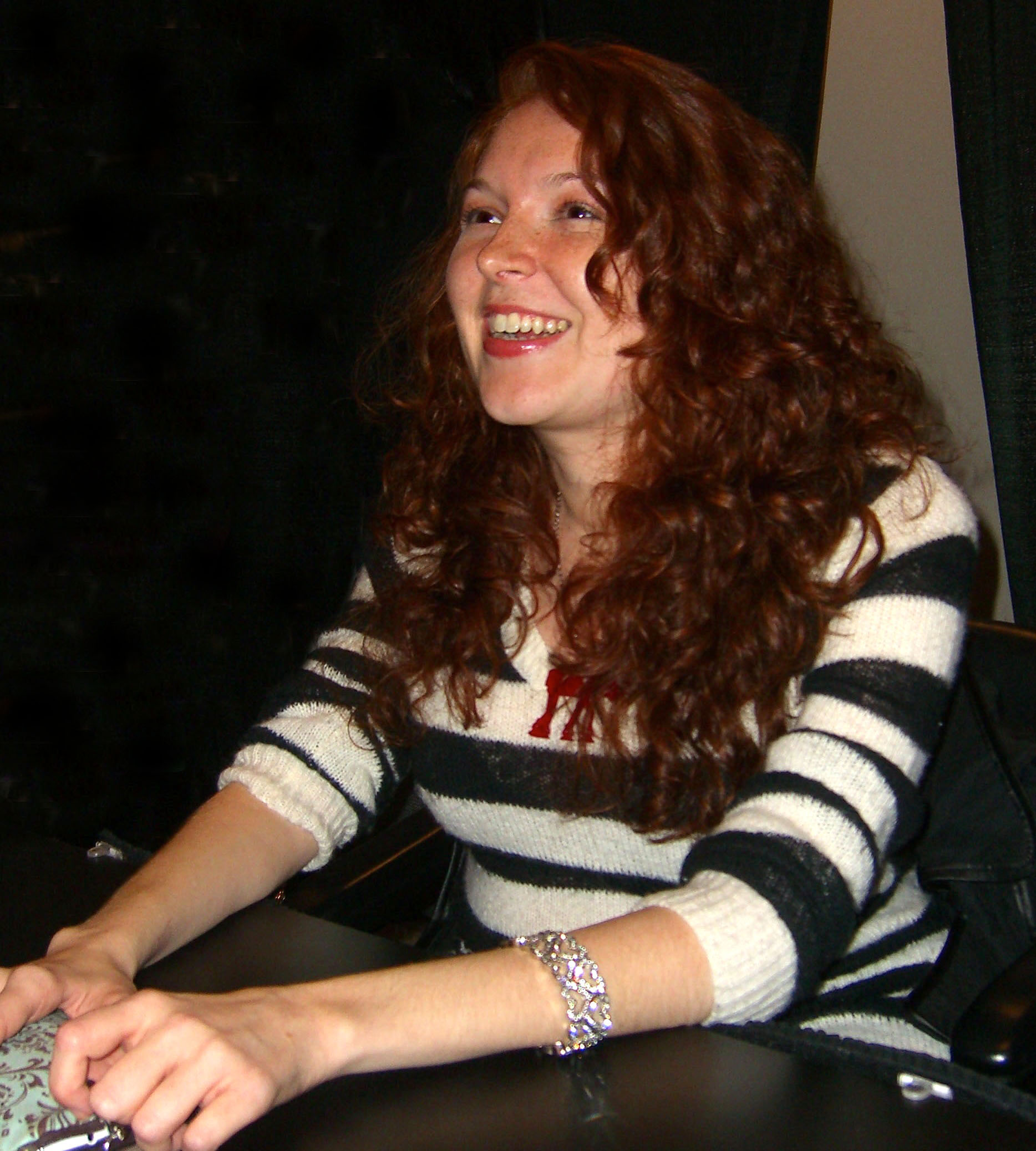
Comics journalist/blogger Jill Pantozzi is among those profiled in the program.

Gerry assigns Alex the task of tracking down a mint condition copy of the 1957 comic book that sparked his interest in the medium. With the 2011 New York Comic Con just six weeks away, Thor works to secure an appearance at the Midtown booth by writer/artist Frank Miller, while his "right hand woman", Zoë, reacts to receiving flowers from an anonymous fan. Featured fans include aspiring comics creator Chris Notarile, who struggles to complete and market a 32-page superhero comic featuring his character, the Protector, in order to acquire a place on Midtown's racks, and Jill Pantozzi, who was diagnosed at age 2 with spinal muscular atrophy, but interacts with other comics fans on her blog and at conventions. Comics creators Frank Miller, Rebekah Isaacs and Amy Reeder have cameos.
