= Midtown Comics =

Comic book shops

- Type: Private
- Industry: Retail
- Founded: 1997
- Founder: Angelo Chantly; Thomas Galitos; Gerry Gladston; Robert Mileta
- Headquarters: New York City, New York, United States
- Number of locations: 3 stores (2010)
- Area served: Worldwide
- Products: Comic books; Graphic novels; Manga
- Website: midtowncomics.com

Midtown Comics is a New York City comic book retailer with three shops in Manhattan and an e-commerce website. Cited by the New York Post as the largest comic book store in the United States, the company opened its first store in the Times Square area in 1997. Its second was opened on Lexington Avenue in 2004, and is known as the Grand Central store for its proximity to Grand Central Terminal. Its downtown store was opened on Fulton Street in the Financial District in November 2010, and its Astoria, Queens outlet store opened in March 2020. It also used to operate a boutique inside Manhattan's Times Square Toys R Us. In 2020 Midtown, which had handled DC Comics' subscription sales for years, launched a sister company, UCS Comic Distributors, which began distributing DC's books.

The store is noted for appearances by celebrities known outside the comic book industry, for its friendly and energetic staff, and for being the most media-friendly comic store in the United States. It was named by The Village Voice in 2012 as the Best Comic Book Store in New York, and has been hailed by CBR.com as "the industry's leading retailer of comic books, graphic novels and manga." On July 13, 2012, the National Geographic Channel premiered Comic Store Heroes, a reality television program set at Midtown Comics. In 2013, it was ranked number 44 on Bleeding Cool magazine's Top 100 Power List of Comic Books, due to its geographic proximity to the then-headquarters of "Big Two" of the American comic book publishing industry, Marvel Comics and DC Comics, and the relationship between the store and industry professionals. In July 2026, The New York Times included the Times Square store in a list of recommended Midtown Manhattan bookstores, calling it a "mecca of fandom", and "a two-story treasure trove of comics and graphic novels."

== History ==
Midtown was founded by partners Gerry Gladston, Angelo Chantly, Thomas Galitos and Robert Mileta. The group met as teenagers in Astoria, Queens, and later sold comics in their video stores in Brooklyn and Queens before opening the flagship Midtown Comics in Manhattan, on West 40th Street and Seventh Avenue. The store houses approximately 500,000 books in its collection. According to The New York Times:

The stereotypical view of comics stores is that they are dim, cramped and dusty places with a no-girls-allowed clubhouse atmosphere. In reality, they run the gamut. For instance, the West Side Midtown store is bright, airy and welcoming to all, with two floors and 5,000 square feet (460 m^{2}) of space. The main floor, which is one story above street level, has a long wall with countless racks of new and recently released comics. The rest of the space offers DVDs, manga, trading cards, back issues and trade paperbacks. Toys and other collectibles are upstairs. The second Midtown store, on Lexington Avenue and 45th Street, though smaller than the first one, is just as inviting.

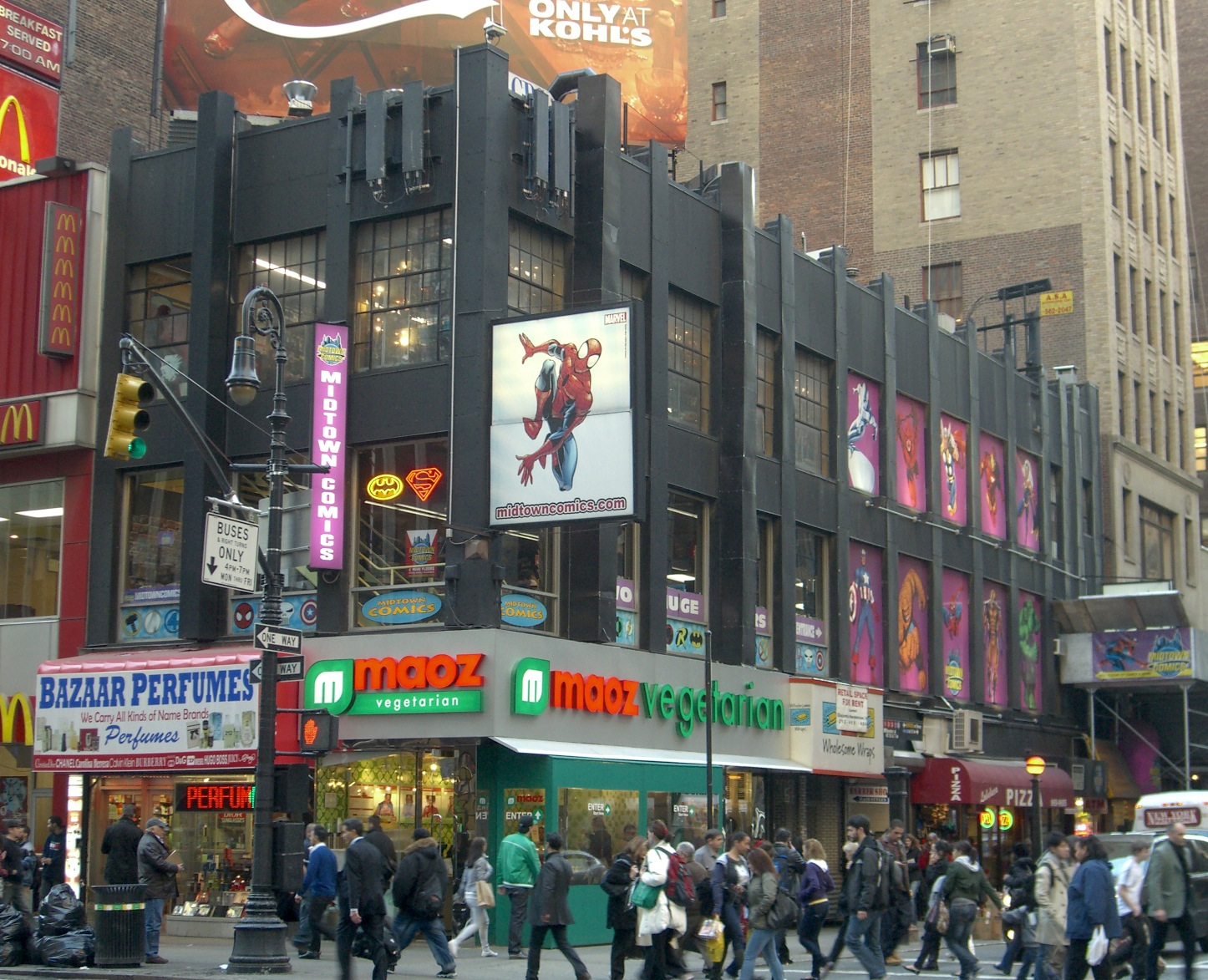
The Times Square branch occupies two floors.

Midtown Comics is the official retail sponsor of New York Comic Con, and has performed this role since the NYCC's inception in 2006. Each year, Midtown creates a "show-within-a-show", featuring round-the-clock appearances by comics creators and variant comic books by publishers like Marvel Comics and Top Cow.

Midtown's website was at first purely informational, but has developed into a full-scale retail website. The stores and website are supported by a warehouse in Queens, and a staff of around 150 who are described by New York Magazine as "a rare mix of nerd knowledge and chummy confidence – [and] who foster an atmosphere where browsing is more than just a means to a badly needed social end."

Midtown also produces a weekly podcast that covers the comic book industry, with a different comic book creator interviewed each week.

On November 10, 2010, Midtown Comics opened a third Manhattan store. Known as their Downtown store, it is located in the Financial District, at 64 Fulton Street, in the southernmost section of the borough. Inaugural book signings were held for that branch featuring Jim Lee and Jonathan Layman, creator of Chew. As of June 2012, Midtown is the largest comic book store in the United States.

The store is a sponsor of Artists Assemble!, a comics festival in Union City, New Jersey that began in February 2013.

In May 2012, Midtown Comics opened a boutique inside the flagship FAO Schwarz toy store in Manhattan's Fifth Avenue shopping district. The boutique offered graphic novels, hardcover books, apparel and collectibles. The boutique ceased operations when FAO Schwarz closed in July 2015. In October 2013, Midtown opened a shop inside the Toys R Us store in Manhattan's Times Square. The shop, which was located next to the second floor animatronic Tyrannosaurus that formed the centerpiece of the Jurassic Park display, offered items similar to that offered in the FAO Schwarz boutique.

In 2013, Midtown was ranked number 44 on Bleeding Cool magazine's Top 100 Power List of Comic Books, due to its geographic proximity to the headquarters of the "Big Two" of the American comic book publishing industry, Marvel and DC, and the fact that industry professionals both shop there and are privy to reaction from Midtown staffers and owners.

In October 2016, Marvel Comics and Midtown Comics jointly decided to pull from circulation J. Scott Campbell's variant cover of the first issue of The Invincible Iron Man, produced exclusively for the store, after previews of the cover were criticized for sexualizing the depicted character, 15-year-old Riri Williams. The cover depicted the character, a teenaged MIT engineering student who reverse engineers one of Iron Man's armored suits to wear herself, in a midriff-baring crop top, in contrast to the more modest way in which artist Stefano Caselli depicted the character in the book's interior art. Campbell called the decision "unfortunate", explained that his rendition of the character was intended to depict "a sassy, coming-of-age young woman". He regarded the reaction to the cover as a "faux controversy", saying, "I gave her a sassy 'attitude'...'sexualizing' was not intended. This reaction is odd." Brian Michael Bendis, the writer on the series, was pleased with the decision to pull the cover, saying that while he liked the face Campbell had drawn on Riri when he viewed the art as a work in progress, he disliked the completed art, saying, "Specialty covers are not in my purview and it was being produced separately from the work of the people involved in making the comic. Not to pass the buck but that's the fact. If I had seen a sketch or something I would have voiced similar concerns. I am certain the next version will be amazing."

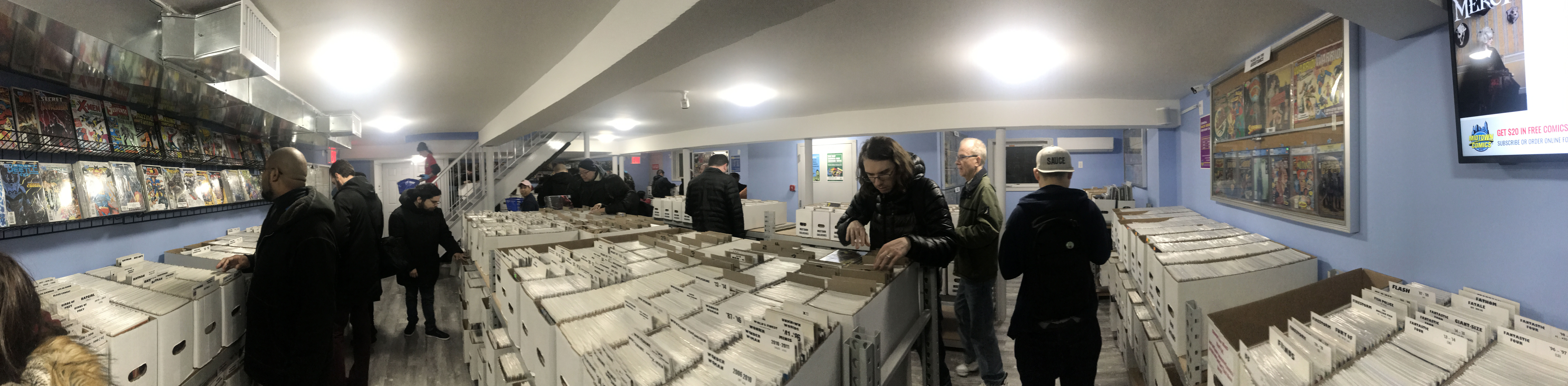
The company offers surplus stock back issues and other merchandise at significant discounts at its Astoria, Queens outlet store, seen here on opening day in March 2020.

On March 7, 2020, Midtown Comics opened its fourth location, an outlet store at 32-11 41st Street in Astoria, Queens, the only branch not in Manhattan. The location's basement level houses an extensive collection of back issues of both recent and vintage single issues and full story arc sets, including rare issues dating from as early as the Golden Age of Comic Books. The back issue selection also includes one dollar books that the store sells for discounted prices when purchased in bulk. The store's ground floor level sells various other types of overstocked company merchandise, including newer and out-of-print graphic novels, manga, action figures, and other collectibles, at discounted prices of up to 70% off their normal retail prices. The store is open only on Saturdays and Sundays, with a pick-up service for comics ordered on the company's website that would allow local residents to avoid traveling into Manhattan. The store garnered a positive review by industry reporter Heidi MacDonald, who likened the outlet to a permanent Midtown Comics warehouse sale. MacDonald lauded the attractive price points of its back issue selection, and expressed surprise at how extensive the store's graphic novel section was for an outlet store.

In 2020, Midtown, having handled DC Comics' subscription sales for years, launched the comic book distributor UCS Comic Distributors, a sister company that, along with Lunar Distribution (which is owned by the Indiana-based company DCBS), would begin distributing that publisher's books beginning on April 27 of that year.

In October, 2024 one of the variant covers with which DC Comics published Absolute Wonder Woman #1 was an exclusive Midtown Comics cover illustrated by Dan Panosian.

In February 2025, as part of the press tour for the feature film Captain America: Brave New World, its star, Anthony Mackie, visited a number of institutions in Manhattan, including appearances on the TV shows, Good Morning America, and Live with Kelly and Mark, and a stop at the Times Square Midtown Comics, where Mackie spoke about having been a customer of the store before he rose to fame.

On February 28, 2026, the Downstore closed in order to make signficiant renovations. The reopening was originally planned for May 12, but was delayed until November 18, 2026, eight days after the Downtown's store's 16th anniversary. Having previously been located on the building's second floor, the expanded store now spanned two full floors, including the ground floor, giving store a street level entrance, and roughly doubling the store's floor space and displayed inventory.

== In media ==
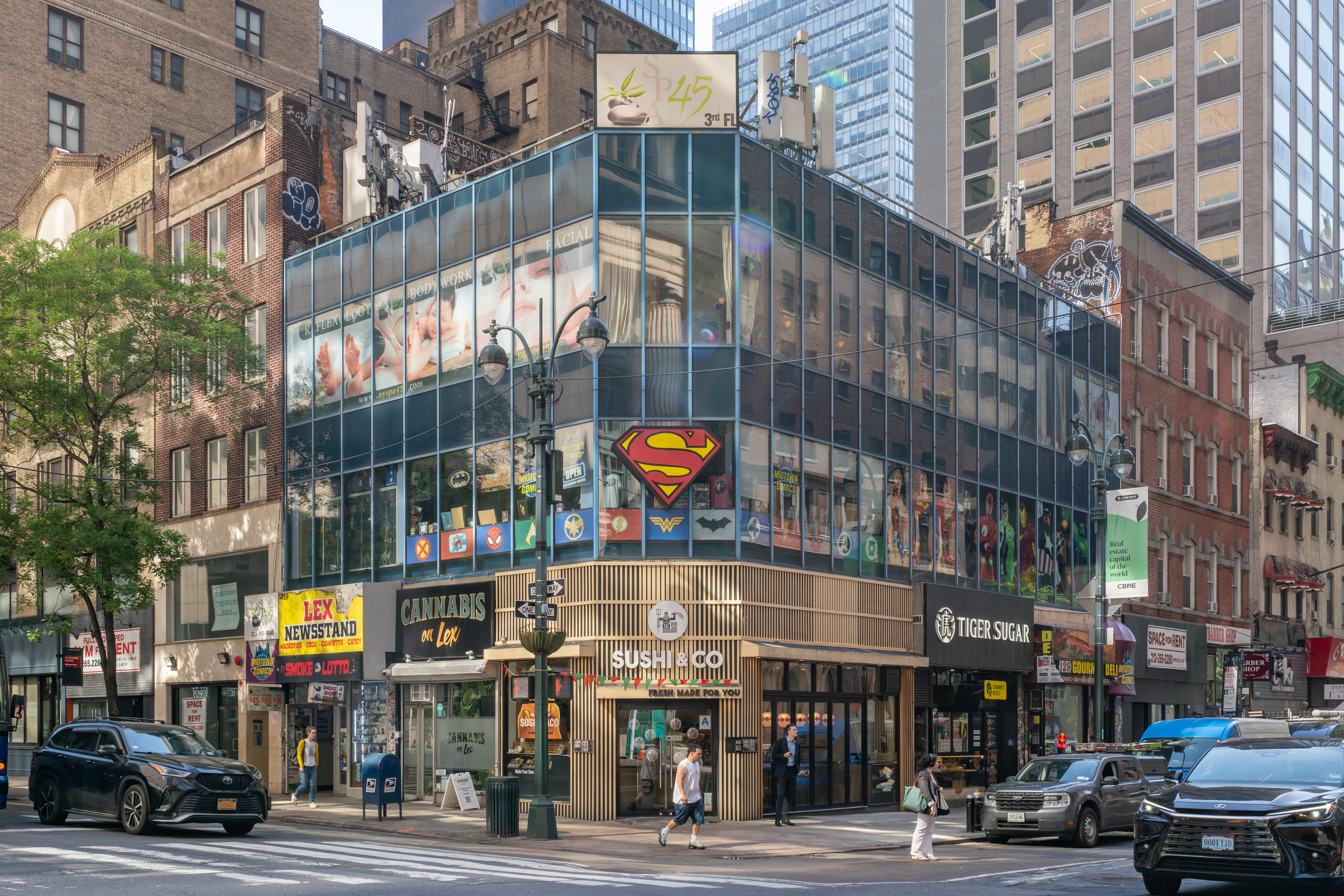
Grand Central store

Midtown Comics has developed a reputation for being the most media-friendly comic store in the United States. As Manhattan is the location of the Big Two of the American comic book publishing industry, Marvel Comics and DC Comics, and the setting for much of the former's stories, Midtown Comics Times Square and its staff have been utilized for local news reporting relating to comic books and popular culture. Midtown Comics co-owner Gerry Gladston, who as of 2019, functions as the company's chief marketing officer, has often been interviewed for comment on such stories, including a 2006 story on vintage comics selling for large amounts of money at auction, a 2009 story on the return of Captain America after Marvel Comics had killed him off two years prior, and a 2014 Marvel storyline that introduced a female Thor. Midtown's staff were also consulted by major media outlets in 2009 regarding the appearance of President Barack Obama in an issue of Spider-Man, and again later that year regarding the anticipation of the release of the film Avatar. The media also rely on Midtown as a source for reaction to industry news and events. Publishers Weekly relies on them for their annual survey about the state of the comics and graphic novel marketplace and for their coverage of Free Comic Book Day, while CBR.com quoted Gladston for reaction to Axel Alonso's 2011 promotion to editor-in-chief of Marvel Comics. Gladston was consulted by multiple publications on the effects on new readership of DC Comics' 2011 relaunch, The New 52, for which Midtown Comics held a midnight signing on August 31, 2011.

Midtown Comics Times Square was the location of the December 21, 2010 press conference in which Marvel Comics Editor-in-Chief Joe Quesada and Executive Editors Tom Brevoort and Axel Alonso announced the 2011 company-wide crossover storyline "Fear Itself". It was later the location of the March 31, 2012 New York City Launch Party for the Disney XD TV series, Ultimate Spider-Man, where Marvel Chief Creative Officer Joe Quesada and series writer/producer Joe Kelly presented a sneak preview of the series' pilot episode for small audiences of fans. In January 2015, Marvel announced their "Secret Wars" storyline at a press conference held at Midtown.

The store has also been mentioned in comic book stories themselves. In Ex Machina #12 (August 2005) by Brian K. Vaughn and Wildstorm Productions, the main character, Mitchell Hundred, laments the closing of a beloved comic book store in Lower Manhattan following the September 11 attacks, and a friend mentions some real-life comics shops that are still open, including St. Mark's Comics, Jim Hanley's Universe, and Midtown Comics. Comic book writer Mark Millar explicitly references the store in Ultimate Comics Avengers 3 #2 (October 2010), in which Nerd Hulk requests permission from Captain America to attend a book signing there.

On July 13, 2012, the National Geographic Channel premiered Comic Store Heroes, a reality television program set at the store, and starring Gladston, Marketing Manager Thor Parker, and pricing expert Alex Rae. Like similar series such as Pawn Stars and Comic Book Men, the program focuses on the interactions between the store's staff and its devoted comics aficionado customer base, as well as the conflict among its staff as it prepares its booth for the New York ComicCon. Parker explains that Comic Store Heroes is distinct from filmmaker Kevin Smith's reality series, Comic Book Men, saying, "We're fans of Kevin's show and what it brings to the table, but we wanted to take things in a different direction. We wanted to try and work [past] the typical stereotypes about comic book fans and show that comics and the comic community have the ability to help people find acceptance, become part of an extremely welcoming family, and really make a difference in people's lives."

In 2017, ABC News used the Times Square store as the remote location portion of a segment reporting on the controversial Marvel storyline "Secret Empire".

In March 2019, the TruTV hidden camera television series Impractical Jokers filmed a segment at the Downtown location, during a book signing by actor Zachary Levi to promote his film Shazam!. The segment was part of the program's eighth-season premiere, which debuted on March 28, 2019.

== Signings and appearances ==
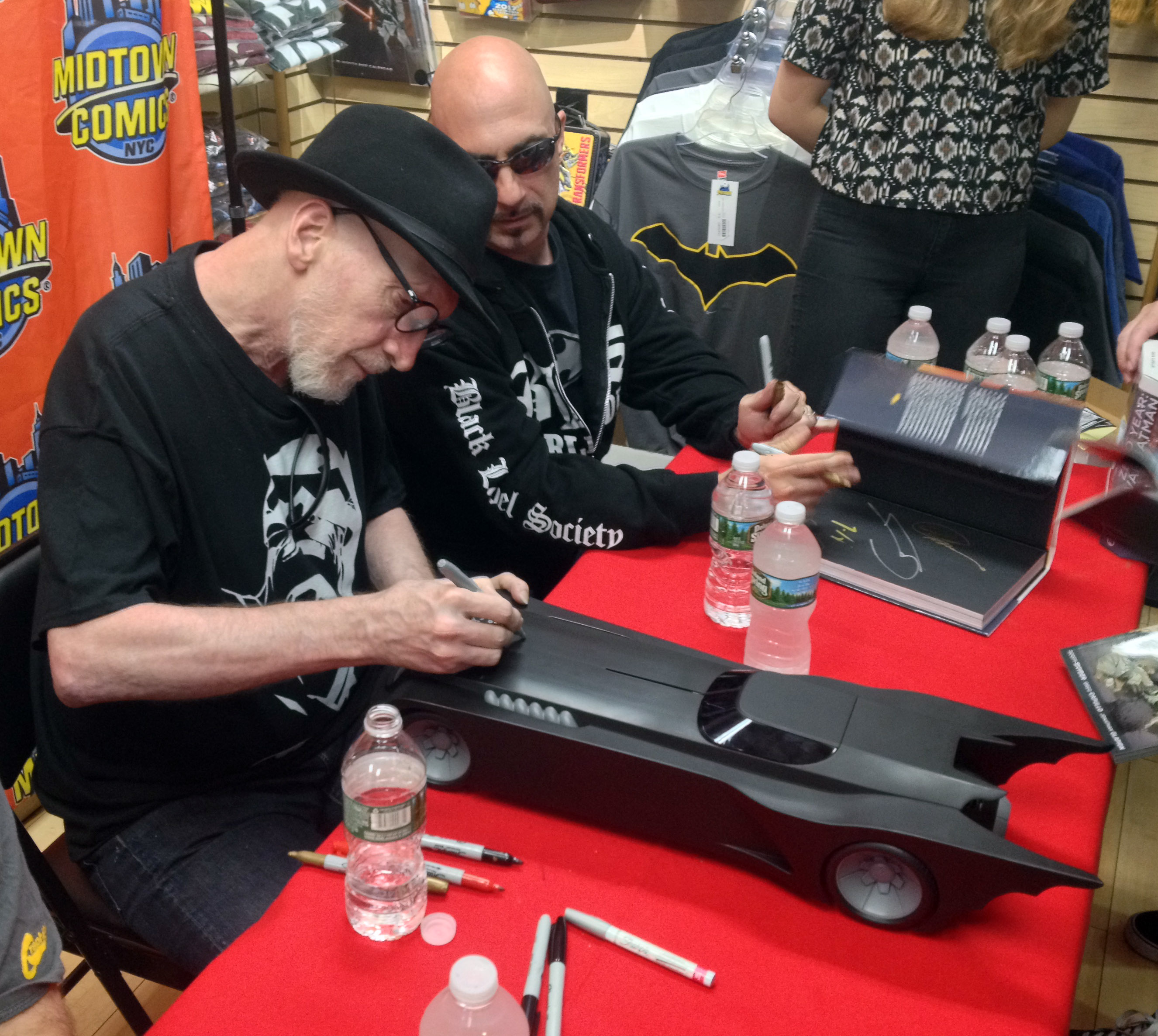
Creators Frank Miller and Greg Capullo signing a toy Batmobile at the store's third annual Batman Day celebration in 2016

Midtown Comics has hosted signings by comic book creators, including Rob Liefeld, Dave Gibbons, Mark Millar and Simone Bianchi, and with celebrities known outside the comic book industry, including Amber Benson, Tim Gunn, Fall Out Boy, Olivia Munn, New York City Mayor Michael Bloomberg, filmmaker Kevin Smith actor Zachary Quinto, and civil rights leader and U.S. Congressman John Lewis.

The store will sometimes hold special midnight releases to begin selling certain high-profile books during the first minutes of the Wednesday shipping day, before other stores are able to. These events usually feature store appearances by creators, including a September 2008 appearance by Peter David and Mike Perkins to promote The Dark Tower: Treachery and The Stand: Captain Trips, and an August 2011 appearance by Jim Lee and Geoff Johns to promote titles related to DC Comics' 2011 "Flashpoint" storyline and its subsequent The New 52 relaunch.

== Notes ==
a: There is some dispute on this point, as Alex Zalben states in a January 2026 article for Comic Book Club that Mile High Comics in Denver is the largest by square footage, and ranks Midtown as seventh by that criterion.
b: DC Comics, one of the Big Two, moved its headquarters to Burbank, California in 2015.
