= Tony Harris (artist) =

American comic book artist (born 1969)

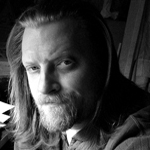
- Areas: Writer, Penciller, Inker, Colourist
- Notable works: Starman, vol. 2 Ex Machina; JSA: Liberty File; JSA: Unholy Three
- Awards: Nominated for 19 Eisner Awards and winner of two

Tony Harris (born 1969) is an American comic book artist, known for his work on series such as Starman, Iron Man, and Ex Machina. He has been nominated for nineteen Eisner Awards and has won two.

== Career ==
Harris began his comics career in 1989. Initially, he flitted from assignment to assignment and worked on T-shirts and ads to pay the bills during dry spells in his comics work. He rose to prominence in 1994 with the publication of DC comics' Starman. Summarizing his career up to this point, he remarked "When you jump around as a freelancer, it's easy to have your attention span dwindle down to that of a gnat. When I got Starman, I had to buckle down and just get serious about the work." Co-created with James Robinson, Starman led the two to critical acclaim and eventually an Eisner Award for the "Sand and Stars" story arc.

After four and a half years on Starman, Harris left to pursue other projects but remained the cover artist on for another year and a half. During this time he was also one of the original members of Atlanta's Gaijin Studios.

He pencilled the series Ex Machina with Brian K. Vaughan, published by Wildstorm from 2004 to 2010, and War Heroes with Mark Millar, published by Image Comics, which has only had three issues published as of 2013. In April 2010, Following the completion of Ex Machina, Harris announced that he and B. Clay Moore would produce a series called The Further Adventures of the Whistling Skull, this was later turned into JSA Liberty Files: The Whistling Skull, tying it into the earlier JSA Liberty Files stories he did, and the first issue saw print in December 2012. Concurrently with this, he launched a new series with Steve Niles, Chin Music, in April 2013, then a new creator-owned series, Roundeye: For Love.

In the late 1990s he moved on to form Jolly Roger Studio, in Macon, Georgia.

Other works include keyframe animation and storyboards for Chevrolet commercial, illustration for Cartoon Network, product design and illustration for Universal's The Mummy.

== Controversy ==
In November 2012, Harris posted a controversial essay about female cosplayers on his Facebook page, which drew congratulations from some of his fans, but criticism from others for being sexist.

In April of 2013, Harris was paid by Comic Book Store Owner Mike McDaniel of Heroes and Villains in Warner Robins, Georgia, for a commission to honor Bert Christman, a Golden Age comic book creator who died in World War II. Despite repeated inquires by McDaniel on the status of the commission, Harris has not completed the work and McDaniel remains not refunded. McDaniel went public on his store's Facebook page in June of 2019 with the issue.

In October 2019, Harris had failed to deliver a $1200 commission to fan Seth Talley. Talley had paid for the commission seven years prior. Talley had reached out to Harris's agent, who reported that Harris had not worked on them. Comic news website "Bleeding Cool" reached out to Harris, who provided visual evidence of the commission, but then reported he would be destroying the piece rather than finishing it. After Bleeding Cool ran an article on the matter, Talley was repaid via the CashApp.

== Technique ==
Harris makes extensive use of models and photo reference in his work, and composes panels featuring multiple characters with models he uses to represent specific characters. Ex Machina: The First Hundred Days, the first collected trade paperback of that series, featured a "Cast of Characters" page showing the 12 models that starred as the characters in that storyline, followed by a gallery showing how several excerpted pages from that story progressed from photo to pencil art to inks to colors.

== Awards ==
- 1997 Eisner Award for Best Penciller/Inker or Penciller/Inker Team (with Wade Von Grawbadger, for Starman)
- 2005 Eisner Award for New Series (with Brian K Vaughan and Tom Fesiter, for Ex Machina)

== Bibliography ==
=== DC ===
- Batman: Legends of the Dark Knight #169-171 (2003)
- Ex Machina #1-50 (2004–10)
- Green Lantern Corps Quarterly #7 (1993)
- Hourman #22 (2001)
- JSA: All-Stars, miniseries, #4 (2003)
- JSA: Liberty File, miniseries, #1-2 (2000)
- JSA: Unholy Three, miniseries, #1-2 (2000)
- JSA Liberty Files: The Whistling Skull, miniseries, #1-6 (2012-2013)
- Legion: Secret Files 3003 (among other artists) (2004)
- The Legion #25 (among other artists) (2003)
- Starman, vol. 2, #0-5, 7-10, 12-17, 19-26, 29-33, 35, 37, 39-40, 43, 45 (1994–98)
- Superman: Lex 2000 (among other artists) (2001)

=== Marvel ===
- Darkhold: Pages from the Book of Sins #3 (1992)
- Dr. Strange: Flight of Bones #1-2 (1999)
- Iron Man Vol. 3 #86-88 (2004)
- Punisher Summer Special #3 (1993)
- Spider-Man: with Great Power... miniseries #1-4 (2008)
- Star Wars Special: C-3PO (2016)

=== Other publishers ===
- Blade #1–2 (Buccaneer, 1989), with writer Seaborn Mercer
- Down #1 (Image, 2005)
- Frank Frazetta Fantasy Illustrated #2 (Quantumm, 1999)
- Nightbreed #18–20 (Epic, 1992)
- Nightmare on Elm Street (Innovation Publishing, 1991)
- Obergeist: Ragnarok Highway #1–6 (Image, 2001)
- Chin Music #1–2 (Image, 2013, with writer Steve Niles)
