= We Stand On Guard =

Image Comics limited series

We Stand on Guard
- Cover art for We Stand On Guard #1 (July 2015)

Publication information
- Publisher: Image Comics
- Schedule: Monthly
- Format: Limited series
- Publication date: July–December 2015
- No. of issues: 6

Creative team
- Created by: Brian K. Vaughan; Steve Skroce
- Written by: Brian K. Vaughan
- Artist: Steve Skroce
- Colorist: Matt Hollingsworth

We Stand On Guard is a science fiction comics series written by Brian K. Vaughan, with art by Steve Skroce and colouring by Matt Hollingsworth. The first issue, a large 44-page book, was published by Image Comics in July 2015.

The series is set in Canada in the years 2112–2124, in a time when it has been invaded by its neighbour the United States of America. The story centres on a band of resistance fighters in the seemingly vanquished Canada, and their exploits involving skirmishes with the United States Army and its vast supply of mechanised weapons, including giant robots.

We Stand On Guard consists of six issues and is a creator-owned work.

== Plot ==
We Stand on Guard mainly takes place in the year 2124 but features flashbacks from 2110 to 2121.

In 2112, the White House was attacked by drone strikes, resulting in the assassination of the President of the United States. In Ottawa, the Roos family speculate on different terrorist factions and countries that may have launched the drone attack on the United States. In retaliation for the president's death, the United States launched missile strikes into Ottawa, killing Amber and Tommy Roos' parents and causing the children to flee for safety. The United States Army then invaded and occupied Canadian territory since 2112 as Tommy and Amber Roos attempted to flee to Greenland and learned that the United States took interest in seizing control over Canadian water. In 2121, Tommy advised his younger sister to hide in an underground tunnel as he surrendered to US Army forces to be imprisoned.

In winter of 2124, an armed and wandering Amber is attacked by an American doglike droid in the forests of Yellowknife but is rescued by a Canadian "freedom fighter" guerilla group that called themselves "Two-Four" in reference to the Canadian term for a 24-bottle beer case. The group then takes down a gigantic piloted droid but loses a member to the American pilot. Amber then demonstrates her loyalty to the cause by shooting the pilot, is welcomed to the resistance group, and is taken to their base. The American Army officers, along with an enigmatic, high-ranking inquisitor nicknamed "Ma'am", learn of their scout's death in Yellowknife and decide to take action against the Two-Four to prevent an insurgency. Two-Four's leader, Victoria McFadden, is captured by American soldiers and held for interrogation by Ma'am regarding her resistance group's whereabouts. After sessions of futuristic psychological tortures and a promise to try to capture the group's members alive, Victoria gives in and reveals that her team's base is in Giant Mine, a collapsed mine in Yellowknife. Ma'am and a US Army colonel, the former of whom would later receive orders from a US secretary to eventually execute all Two-Four members to keep its pro-independence agenda hidden, launch an operation to take down Two-Four using an aerial fleet and droid armies.

The remaining members of the Two-Four defend themselves from the invading US military forces, losing two more in the process. Les LePage, a former stand-up comedian and actor, broadcasts his group's existence throughout Canada and encourages his fellow Canadians to resist American occupation. Ma'am confirms her nickname as "The American" and reveals to Amber that she was originally from Ottawa, moved to New York as a child, and took a disliking to Canada due to its isolationist stances. As Amber threatened to blow up the plane that both she and Ma'am are in, the inquisitor revealed that a Canadian general was responsible for launching the drone strikes killing the president due to his attempt to prevent the United States from invading his country. Amber activates her dead man's switch, seemingly killing both her and Ma'am and causing the ship's arsenic to sink into and poison one of the last remaining water reserves in North America. The American fleet retreats in light of news regarding the poisoning of the water reserve while Two-Four's remaining members anticipate that the American forces will return. Hearing of the recent events, Canadian prisoners celebrate as both Victoria and Tommy express pride for Amber's war contributions.

== Background and creation ==
Brian K. Vaughan is an American comic book writer who had previously written Pride of Baghdad, a 2006 allegorical graphic novel regarding victims of war in a country. He sought to reuse the idea for Canada, a nation that he was fond of, but with violent resistance that would be seen as relatable by general audiences. He stated that in writing the limited series, he wanted to challenge himself to understand Canada from an outsider perspective and had learned of historical initiatives that the United States had previously set against Canada such as War Plan Red. Vaughan utilized a science fiction setting for his series but also sought to portray his story in a manner that realistically portrays asymmetrical warfare, including with heavy casualties resulting from guerilla warfare campaigns from both sides. He revealed that he based his characters off of people who he knew about, although he did not delve into specifics. Also involved in the limited series comics were the comic book artist Steve Skroce and the Québécois translator Mathieu Chalifoux for the French-speaking character Les LePage, although they made sure that readers understood his motives based on his expressions regardless of if they knew French or not. Vaughan also cut a lot of dialogue from the story as to not overshadow the illustrations by Skroce, who said that he aimed to be consistent with the series' themes of climate change and depleted resources.

Vaughan and Skroce promoted their upcoming release at a Golden Age Collectables event in Vancouver (a comic book store) on 4 July 2015. We Stand on Guard consists of six issues that were released between July to December of 2015 by the comic book publisher Image Comics.

== Reception ==
=== Sales ===
In North America during their debuts in 2015, the first issue of We Stand on Guard sold over 78,000 copies while the last sold over 35,000; while the last issue sold the least, the limited series remained in the list of top 75 books sold in a month. The deluxe edition earned a spot on The New York Times hardcover graphic books bestseller list for June of 2016. In February of 2025, the comics experienced a surge of interest amidst events regarding potential trade wars between the United States and Canada, with sales in one week being more than the entirety of the previous year.

=== Critical response ===
We Stand on Guard received generally positive reviews, with criticism being applied towards the characters. CBC News reviewer Eli Glasner said the work was more "direct and visually explosive" than any prior comic book treatment of Canada-U.S. relations. Paste called it "intriguing, emotional and engaging enough to stand alone as a story". Boing Boing commended it for its "self-contained" and "gripping" story full of "likable characters, exciting action, fabulous art". ScienceFiction.com praised the miniseries for offering social commentary on real world politics but "not bash[ing] readers over the head with it" and Skroce's artwork, although he said that the character development was lacking. A deluxe edition reviewer for AIPT noted that the comic series challenged his political beliefs in an effective manner, that despite the quick pace and violence of the story, it was a "fascinating, well-told, well-drawn story that many readers won’t even realize is taking so many risks". Another reviewer for AIPT on the other hand criticized the characters and story as bland and felt that Skroce's art in the limited series was "a mixed bag" of cool but plausible robot designs but overall stiff drawings. IGN gave a score of 7.7 out of 10 for the first issue, voicing approval for Skroce's art but criticizing the characters for being too bland to care about.

== See also ==
- Defence Scheme No. 1
- War Plan Red
- War of 1812
