= Ex Machina (comics) =

Comic book series (2004–2010)

- Cover art for Ex Machina Vol. 1: The First Hundred Days by Tony Harris.

Publication information
- Publisher: DC Comics/Wildstorm
- Schedule: Monthly
- Genre: Superhero, political drama
- Publication date: August 2004 to August 2010
- No. of issues: 50 (plus 4 specials)
- Main character(s): Mitchell Hundred; Rick Bradbury; Ivan "Kremlin" Tereshkov; Dave Wylie

Creative team
- Written by: Brian K. Vaughan (Garth Ennis for 2 pages in issue #40)
- Penciller(s): Tony Harris (Chris Sprouse/Ex Machina Special #1-2, John Paul Leon/Ex Machina Special #3-4, Jim Lee for 2 pages in issue #40)
- Inker(s): Tom Feister (#1-26); Jim Clark (#27-46); Tony Harris (#47-50); Karl Story (Ex Machina Special #1-2)
- Colorist: JD Mettler

Collected editions
- The First Hundred Days: ISBN 1-4012-0612-3
- Tag: ISBN 1401206263
- Fact v. Fiction: ISBN 1401209882
- March to War: ISBN 1401209971
- Smoke Smoke: ISBN 1401213227
- Power Down: ISBN 1401214983
- Ex Cathedra: ISBN 1401218598
- Dirty Tricks: ISBN 1401225195
- Ring out the Old: ISBN 1401226949
- Term Limits: ISBN 1401228364

Ex Machina is an American creator-owned comic book series, created by Brian K. Vaughan and Tony Harris and published by DC Comics under the Wildstorm imprint. Ex Machina launched in 2004 as part of DC Comics' Wildstorm imprint. The series ended in August 2010 with issue fifty.

The series details the life of Mitchell Hundred (also known as the Great Machine), the world's first and only superhero, who, in the wake of his actions on 9/11, is elected mayor of New York City. The story is set during Hundred's term in office, and interwoven with flashbacks to his past as the Great Machine. Through this, the series explores both the political situations in which Hundred finds himself as well as the mysteries surrounding his superpowers.

== Development ==
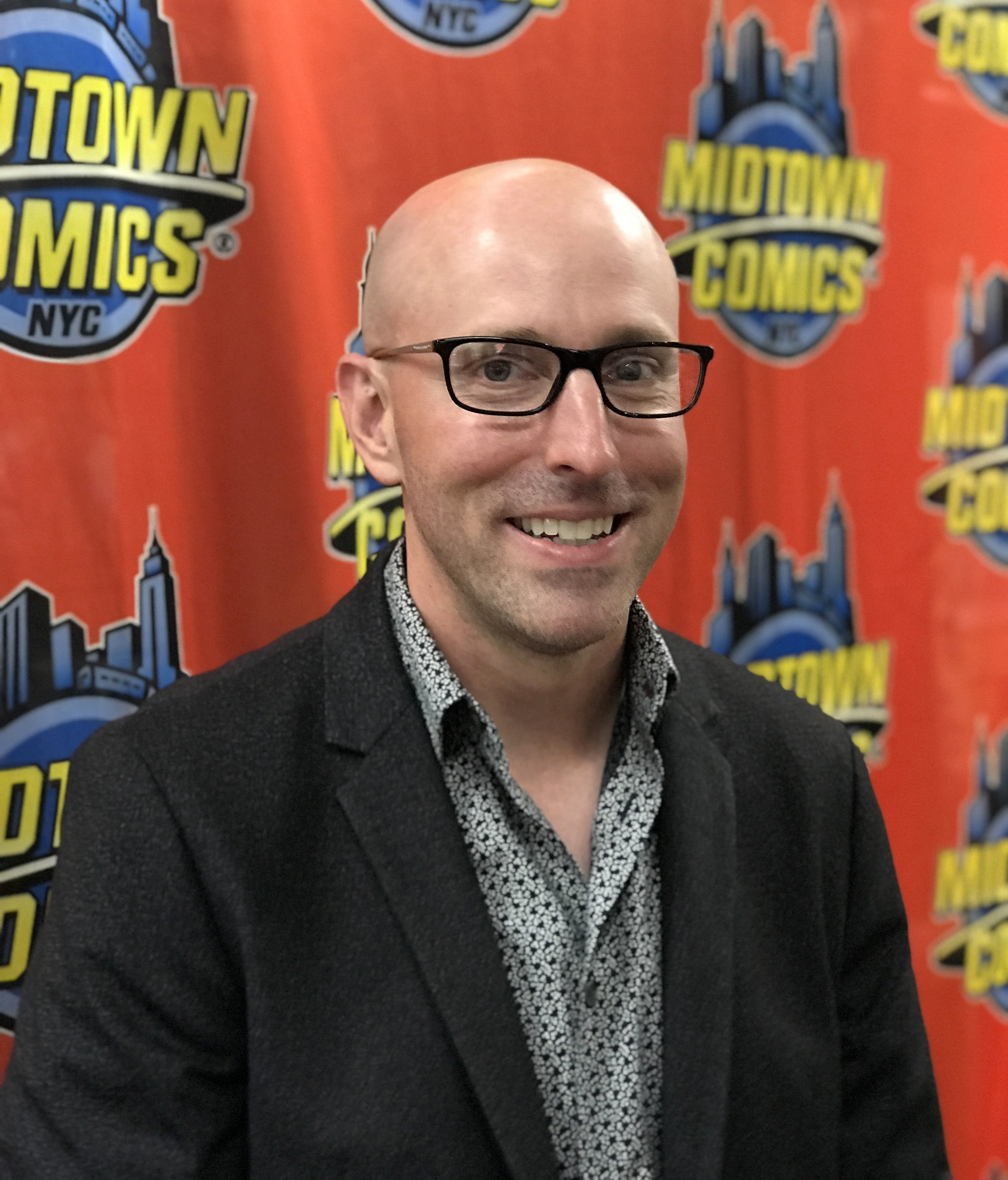
Writer Brian K. Vaughan at Midtown Comics in Manhattan

According to Vaughan, "Ex Machina was about trying to make sense of the world after watching from the roof of my apartment in Brooklyn as these buildings fell, and trying to make sense of politics and this concept of heroism and whether that's a real thing or just something we impose on people. That was all born right out of that day". Vaughan has also said that the comic was "born out of my anger with what passes for our current political leadership (on both sides of the aisle)". Although the series explores real-world contemporary politics, Vaughan stated that he prefers not to discuss political themes overtly. The title of the comic comes from the Latin phrase deus ex machina, and is also a reference to Hundred's superhero persona, the Great Machine, which in the first issue, Mitchell explains that he chose the name "Great Machine" based on a quote about society by Thomas Jefferson.

== Characters ==
- Mitchell Hundred: Before becoming a superhero and mayor, Hundred was a civil engineer. His colleagues say that he knows more about the Brooklyn Bridge than anyone else alive. He was raised by a highly political single mother; this, and his being a keen reader of DC Comics, inspired his life choices. As the result of an explosion from an extradimensional device at the foot of the Brooklyn Bridge, Hundred is permanently scarred (he has markings on the left side of his face and body reminiscent of a circuit board or electrodes); and develops the ability to communicate with and command mechanical devices. This includes anything from guns, to cellphones, to cars (but not a device as simple as a bow-and-arrow). However, they will not necessarily obey him, and may even lie to him. As the Great Machine, Mitchell Hundred utilized many devices he designed after his accident. He wears a rocket backpack that allows him to fly, and uses ray guns and taser gloves as weapons. He has entrusted Kremlin and Rick Bradbury with possession of "jammers" which disrupt his powers. He built them based on dreams (along with some of his crime-fighting weapons), and expects them to be used as a contingency measure in case he ever goes mad with power. Hundred is visually based on a real-life friend of Tony Harris. IGN named him 48th of the Top 100 Comic Book Heroes.
- Rick Bradbury: Mitchell's best friend, retired U.S. Marine Captain (he claims to have fought in "one and a half wars"); and head of security. As a lieutenant on the Harbor Patrol he witnesses the incident that gives Mitchell his amazing abilities and goes on to assist his career as a crime fighter and politician.
- Ivan "Kremlin" Tereshkov: A mechanic on Coney Island and family friend. He acts as mentor for Mitchell, inspiring him to don the Great Machine costume. The Russian immigrant is not pleased that Mitchell gave up his superhero career to pursue a profession he does not think highly of. Though disillusioned by the Soviet Union, he still believes in the dream of communism. Kremlin believes that it was Mitchell's cosmic purpose to become the Great Machine, and he is covertly working to ensure that Hundred is not re-elected.
- Commissioner Angotti: As police commissioner of New York City, Amy Angotti often finds herself dealing with bizarre cases linked to Mitchell Hundred and his powers.
- Dave Wylie: Mitchell Hundred's deputy mayor and good friend is a lowly councilman who got talked into running with that "nut". Thinking he was only going to help the Republican party spoil the democratic candidate he was treated to a surprise landslide victory and now finds himself the recipient of complaints by many critics of the administration.
- Journal Moore: A former City Hall intern, she was promoted to "Special Advisor on Youth Affairs" by Hundred and is now seen frequently assisting him in many of his duties. She is hospitalized after a ricin gas attack during an anti-war demonstration and succumbs to her injuries.
- Candice Watts: Mayor Hundred's fourth Chief of Staff after the former three resigned after only two weeks of Hundred in office.
- Jack Pherson: Mitchell Hundred's nemesis as the Great Machine, first appears in the Ex Machina Special. Pherson is a sound technician who tries to figure out the secret of the Great Machine's power so that he can make money from it. He captures a sound bite of Hundred in action, and studies it carefully to determine the source of the power of the Great Machine's "voice". After Pherson hears his pet African Grey parrot repeat the recorded phrase (duplicating frequency and timbre in a manner Pherson's audio gear cannot), he gains the ability to hear and talk to animals. He learns a means for disrupting Hundred's powers and utilizes it in pursuit of his cause of extremist animal rights. He goes on to draw out Hundred, but Hundred turns his powers against him, resulting in his death by mauling by a pack of dogs, followed by an explosion which brings part of a building down on him. Despite this, Kremlin asserts that Pherson is still alive. Pherson's parrot, which has been seen in the present time of the book, also appears to have both an increased intellect and some of the same powers.
- Trip: An employee of the governor of New York. At his employer's behest, he tries to blackmail Hundred into subordinating himself to the governor; knowing that the blackmail was false, Hundred confiscates it and threatens to stop Trip's pacemaker if he ever tries something similar again.
- Jackson Georges: An NSA cryptologist who works with Hundred to try and better understand his powers. Prolonged exposure to the fragment that gave Hundred his power, as well as the shock of the September 11 attacks, makes Georges lose his mind.
- Connie Georges: Jackson's wife. Driven insane by exposure to the fragment, she stabs herself with it and gains Hundred-esque powers. She goes on a killing/mutilating spree in the subway before Hundred kills her in Gracie Mansion.
- Leto: Owns the comic book store that Hundred went to as a kid. After seeing Hundred's success, he decides that he could be a superhero too. He dons insectoid-like full body armor and a government surplus jetpack and begins prowling the streets as "Automaton", leading people to speculate that he is a robot built by Hundred. He is shot by Kremlin after violently reacting to Bradbury and Kremlin's discovery of his secret; over a year later, he is seen to have become homeless.
- January Moore: Journal Moore's sister. After her sister's death, she becomes an intern for Hundred's office at the invitation of Wylie. Along with Kremlin, January is actively working to subvert Hundred's administration and ensure that his re-election will fail.
- Trouble (Monica): A tour guide who becomes a masked adventurer after interacting with Great Machine, and becoming infatuated with him. Her actions prove increasingly troublesome to Mitchell and his administration.

== Synopsis ==
Ex Machina focuses on story of civil engineer Mitchell Hundred, alternating between the past and the present. The plot is centered on Hundred's current life as the mayor of New York City, with flashbacks to his prior life as "The Great Machine", the world's first and only super hero. Hundred has the ability to communicate directly with machines, which he used to prevent the fall of the second tower in the 9/11 attacks.

=== Early life and "The Great Machine" ===
Mitchell Hundred was born in 1968 to Thomas and Martha. Early in his childhood, his mother killed his father in self-defence. Thirty years later, Hundred was caught in an explosion from an unknown device at the base of the Brooklyn Bridge. After the accident, he discovers that he is able to control and communicate with machinery in the hospital. After being released from the hospital, he is robbed in a convenience store, which leads him to experiment with the use of his powers. In the year 2000, Hundred decides to become the world's first superhero "The Great Machine", after talking to his friend Ivan "Kremlin" Tereshkov.

In March 2001, the Great Machine learns that his home-made ray gun has the power to open an inter-dimensional portal. That same time, the Great Machine meets a man named Jack Pherson, who has the ability to control and communicate with animals. Pherson learns that Hundred is the Great Machine, and plans a multi-pronged attack against him. This culminates in one final battle where Pherson is presumed dead after a building collapses on him. Around this time, Monica first sees the Great Machine during his efforts to fight crime, and starts to become infatuated with him from a distance. That summer, Hundred decides to run for mayor after talking to David Wylie, and announces his candidacy on July 4 by unmasking and effectively retiring as The Great Machine. Mitchell gives up his helmet and jetpack to the NSA, after meeting with one of their cryptologists, Jackson Georges.

On September 11, 2001, the Great Machine stops United Flight 175 before it crashes into the south tower of the World Trade Center. This helps him secure the election and become Mayor of New York City, after spending election day under surveillance in a sensory deprivation tank to ensure he cannot manipulate the election with his powers.

=== Mayoralty of New York City ===
Mitchell Hundred is inaugurated as Mayor of New York City on January 9, 2002, and the comic book series begins with his first days in office. Hundred survives an assassination attempt, where he discovers that a bow-and-arrow is outside of his control with his powers. This parallels the rise of Connie Georges, who develops psychosis due to exposure to the fragment of circuit board that gave Mitchell Hundred his powers. Connie stabs herself with the fragment and cuts her left arm off, then murders and mutilates her husband, daughter, and family dog. She gains Hundred-esque powers and moves to the Manhattan sewers, wearing a hazard protection suit and spray-painting glyphs that resemble the one found on the fragment. She eventually confronts Hundred by infiltrating Gracie Mansion, implying that Hundred is a Christ-figure who should spread his 'gospel'. Hundred is forced to kill her in self defense. Later that year, a comic book store owner named Leto is inspired to become a super hero, called "Automaton". He is thwarted the next day by Kremlin, who destroys Leto's armor. Around this time, Hundred learns the truth about his father's death from his mother Martha.

The second year of his administration begins with a terrorist gas attack during an anti-war demonstration, leaving one of the Mayor's aides in a coma. Police Commissioner Angotti works with Hundred (in disguise) to apprehend the man responsible for the attacks, while his aide Journal Moore finally succumbs to the ricin gas and dies. Months later, Hundred meets Journal's sister January for the first time. On August 14, 2003, the Northeast Blackout of 2003 is accidentally caused by Augustyn Zeller, a traveler from an alternate timeline. During the blackout, Hundred is unable to use his powers. The next day, Hundred confronts Zeller and forcibly returns him to his own timeline, while Zeller leaves him with an ominous warning. The year ends with Mitchell Hundred and his best friend Rick Bradbury travelling to Vatican City at the invitation of Pope John Paul II. During their private meeting, a Russian agent attempts to mind-control Hundred into murdering the pope. The pope helps Mitchell have an epiphany with "God", helping him overcome his conditioning. After the ordeal, Mitchell tells the pope that "God" told him he will be the President of the United States.

By the summer of 2004, Mitchell Hundred is asked to give the keynote address at the 2004 Republican National Convention. By this time, Monica has become the masked adventurer named Trouble, emboldened by the story of Hundred as The Great Machine. She disrupts the multi-day convention by BASE jumping from the remaining World Trade Center tower, and writing graffiti on the Empire State Building. This climaxes with Trouble breaking into City Hall to meet Mitchell Hundred. The year ends with Hundred announcing that he will not run for re-election. As a result of a rash of animal attacks, Hundred becomes concerned that Jack Pherson is back. He puts on a mask and enters the sewers to hunt for Pherson. In the sewers, Hundred encounters an automaton. The automaton criticizes him for misusing his powers, which it states were intended to prepare the Earth for invasion. Meanwhile, journalist Suzanne Padilla is exposed to a "white box" built by Hundred; she gains the ability to influence and control human minds and memories, as well as enhanced strength, speed, and the ability to fly.

As Hundred's term comes to an end, he finds himself confronted with Suzanne Padilla in April 2005. Padilla attacks Mitchell Hundred and dumps him in the East River. She then steals Hundred's dimensional portal-opening device from his mother Martha and kills her in the process. Suzanne activates the portal-opening device where a hell-like dimension is seen and attempts to throw January into the portal to make sure the forces of hell can come safely. Hundred dons the Great Machine costume for the last time to battle Suzanne, revealing that the supposed "jammer" for his powers never really worked. He pushes her through the inter-dimensional portal before it closes. Before the police arrive, he and Bradbury switch places. Bradbury takes criminal responsibility to protect his best friend, the Mayor.

=== Federal politics and series ending ===
After declining to run for re-election, Hundred goes on to become the United States ambassador to the United Nations. Hundred reveals his final act as Mayor on September 1, 2006, with the rebuilding of the Twin Towers to inspire New York and the world. A year later, Mitchell has a horrifying vision revealing that there are multiple versions of him having conquered several realities and will never stop trying ways to invade his, as they are all "together". Later, having spent a year in prison and with his family abandoning him, a drunken and disheveled Bradbury comes to Hundred, revealing that he has always been in love with him. When a stunned Hundred pushes him away, noting that his friend is drunk, a furious Bradbury punches him and leaves him for good.

In January 2008, Kremlin summons Hundred to his home, threatening to release Suzanne's files indicating Hundred used his powers to fix the mayoral election, determined to keep Mitchell a hero to New York. Mitchell refuses, saying he can do more to help the world as President. Kremlin initially threatens to shoot Mitchell, but then turns his gun on himself. Instead of trying to stop him, Mitchell uses his powers to make the gun go off, killing Kremlin.

Hundred looks back his four years in office, from 2002 through "godforsaken 2005", with a look of dejection. It is revealed on the final issue that he was actually talking to the jetpack he used to wear during his time as The Great Machine. On the final pages, it is revealed that Hundred lives in Number One Observatory Circle as the Vice President of the United States under President John McCain. As he looks at a picture of his former friends, he pronounces the last words of the series: "Fade to black".

== Collected editions ==
Vol	Title	Contents	Pages	Format	Release	ISBN
Trade Paperbacks
1	The First Hundred Days	Ex Machina #1–5	136	TPB	1 Feb 2005	978-1401206123
2	Tag	Ex Machina #6–10	128	TPB	1 Oct 2005	978-1401206260
3	Fact v. Fiction	Ex Machina #11–16	144	TPB	5 Apr 2006	978-1401209889
4	March To War	Ex Machina #17–20, Ex Machina Special #1–2	144	TPB	6 Dec 2006	978-1401209971
5	Smoke Smoke	Ex Machina #21–25	120	TPB	7 Mar 2007	978-1401213220
6	Power Down	Ex Machina #26–29, Inside The Machine Special	144	TPB	14 Nov 2007	978-1401214982
7	Ex Cathedra	Ex Machina #30-34	128	TPB	21 Oct 2008	978-1401218591
8	Dirty Tricks	Ex Machina #35–39, Ex Machina Special #3	160	TPB	15 Dec 2009	978-1401225193
9	Ring Out The Old	Ex Machina #40–44, Ex Machina Special #4	160	TPB	18 May 2010	978-1401226947
10	Term Limits	Ex Machina #45–50	168	TPB	30 Nov 2010	978-1401228361
Deluxe Editions
1	Book One	Ex Machina #1-11	272	HC	15 Jul 2008	978-1401218140
1	Book One	Ex Machina #1-11	272	TPB	21 Jan 2014	978-1401244989
2	Book Two	Ex Machina #12–20, Ex Machina Special #1–2	272	HC	8 Dec 2009	978-1401226770
2	Book Two	Ex Machina #12–20, Ex Machina Special #1–2	272	TPB	27 May 2014	978-1401246914
3	Book Three	Ex Machina #21–29, Ex Machina Special #3, Inside The Machine Special	272	HC	25 May 2010	978-1401228002
3	Book Three	Ex Machina #21–29, Ex Machina Special #3, Inside The Machine Special	272	TPB	30 Sep 2014	978-1401250034
4	Book Four	Ex Machina #30–40	272	HC	23 Nov 2010	978-1401228453
4	Book Four	Ex Machina #30–40	272	TPB	27 Jan 2015	978-1401250027
5	Book Five	Ex Machina #41–50, Ex Machina Special #4	320	HC	19 Apr 2011	978-1401229993
5	Book Five	Ex Machina #41–50, Ex Machina Special #4	320	TPB	26 May 2015	978-1401254223
Compendiums
1	Compendium One	Ex Machina #1-25, Ex Machina Special #1-2	664	TPB	24 Mar 2020	978-1401299897
2	Compendium Two	Ex Machina #26-50, Ex Machina Special #3-4	704	TPB	23 Feb 2021	978-1779508041
Omnibus
	The Complete Series Omnibus	Ex Machina #1-50, Ex Machina Special #1-4	1,440	HC	14 Nov 2023	978-1779525635

== Reception and awards ==
Upon the release of the first series, IGN gave the series positive reviews: "Brian Vaughan uses Ex Machina to examine the water cooler topics of the moment, such as gay marriage, but also attempts to understand heroism in America's new era...What's most impressive about Vaughan's work is that his four monthly books are very different, not only thematically, but with cadence, pacing and dialogue". Ex Machina won the 2005 Eisner Award for Best New Series.

In Cultures of War in Graphic Novels, Tatiana Prororkova and Nimrod Tal suggest that protagonist Mitchell Hundred is a stand-in for the author's view on the Iraq War at the time. Analyzing Hundred's reaction to the Iraq War protests, "writer Brian Vaughan appeared to believe, as Hundred did, that the 'only people in the country opposing an Iraq invasion' were peaceniks [and that] opposition to the Iraq War, and the country's foreign policy, was foolish in the extreme".

== Film ==
New Line Cinema picked up the rights to make a film adaptation in July 2005. Oscar Isaac was brought on in January 2020 to produce, and star as Hundred, with the project being retitled The Great Machine to avoid confusion with the 2014 film Ex Machina, in which Isaac also starred.
