= Brian K. Vaughan =

American screenwriter and comic book creator

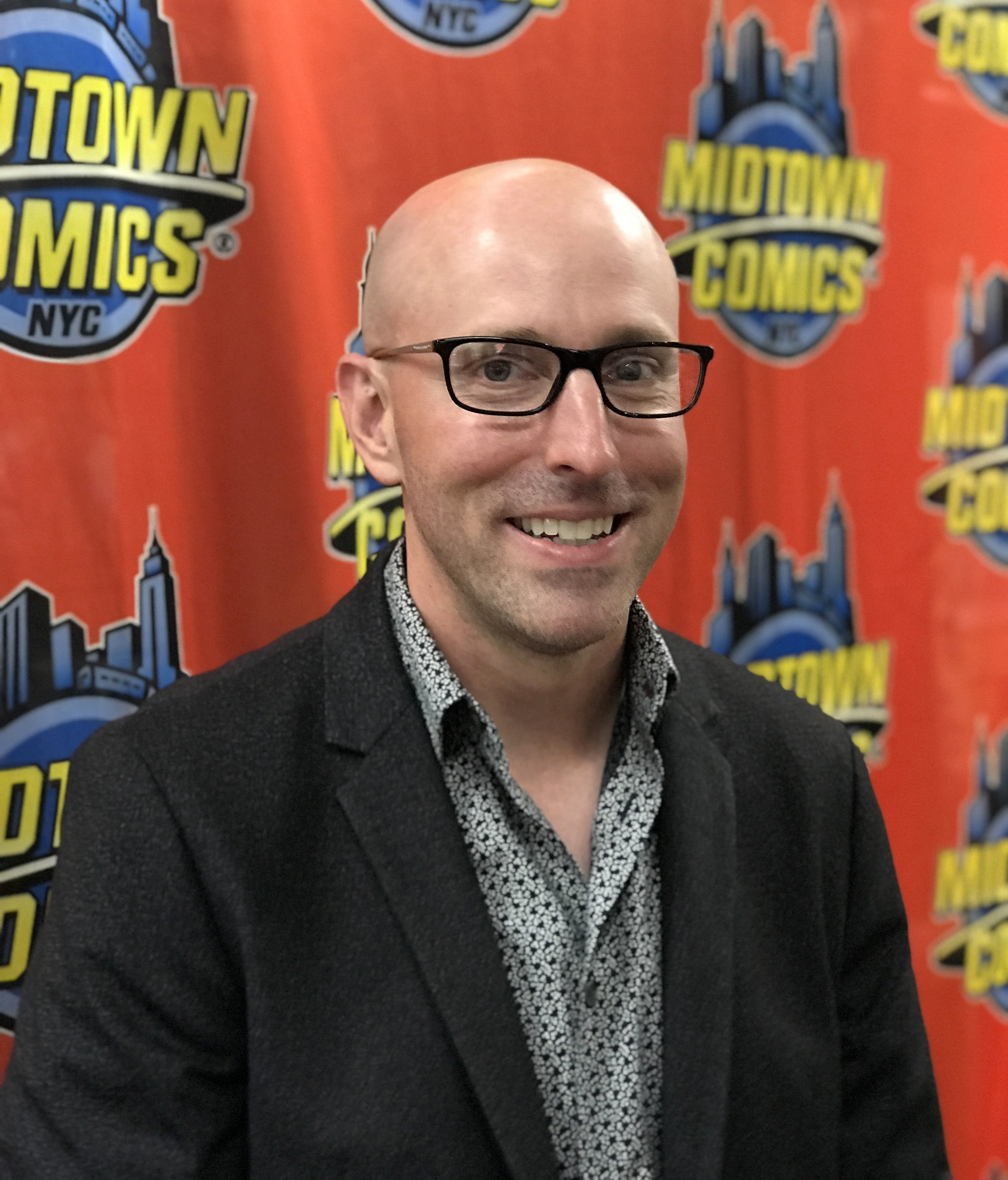
- Vaughan at a signing at Midtown Comics in Manhattan
- Born: July 17, 1976 (age 50); Cleveland, Ohio, U.S.
- Occupations: Comic book writer, television writer, television producer, screenwriter
- Writing career
- Genres: Science fiction, superhero, space opera/fantasy
- Notable works: Comics: Y: The Last Man; Runaways; Ex Machina; Pride of Baghdad; Saga; Paper Girls; Television: Lost; Under the Dome

Brian K. Vaughan (/vɔːn/; born July 17, 1976) is an American writer and producer. He is best known for the comic book series Y: The Last Man, Ex Machina, Runaways, Pride of Baghdad, Saga, and Paper Girls.

Vaughan was a writer, story editor, and producer of the television series Lost during seasons three through five. He was nominated for a Writers Guild of America Award for Best Dramatic Series at the Writers Guild of America Awards 2008 for his work on the fourth season. The writing staff was nominated for the award again at the Writers Guild of America Awards 2009 ceremony for their work on the fifth season. He was formerly the showrunner and executive producer of the television series Under the Dome (2013– 15) and co-wrote the screenplay of the film Dune: Part Three (2026).

Wired describes Vaughan's comics work as "quirky, acclaimed stories that don't pander and still pound pulses". His creator-owned comics work is also characterized by "finite, meticulous, years-long story arcs", on which Vaughan comments, "That's storytelling, with a beginning, a middle, and an end. Something like Spider-Man, a book that never has a third act, that seems crazy." In 2007, Erik Malinowski, also of Wired, called Vaughan "the greatest comic book visionary of the last five years", comparing him to Frank Miller, Alan Moore, Paul Pope, and Steve Niles, and praised his addition to the TV series Lost as redeeming that series' third season.

For his writing, Vaughan has won 14 Eisner Awards, 15 Harvey Awards, and two Hugo Awards.

== Early life ==
Brian K. Vaughan was born July 17, 1976 in Cleveland, Ohio, to Geoffrey and Catherine Vaughan. He grew up in Rocky River and Westlake. Before beginning his career in comics, Vaughan worked as an auxiliary police officer, a live-in dog butler, and a psychiatric ward employee.

Vaughan and his older brother are both fans of writer Peter David, and according to Vaughan, their adolescent comics reading was largely defined by a shared love of David's 12-year run on The Incredible Hulk. Vaughan also cites Joss Whedon as the reason he wanted to become a writer, a decision he made while attending St. Ignatius High School, from which he graduated in 1994.

Vaughan attended the New York University Tisch School of the Arts to study film. While a student there, Vaughan took part in Marvel Comics's Stan-hattan Project, a class for fledgling comic book writers.

== Career ==
Vaughan's first credit was for Marvel Comics' Tales from the Age of Apocalypse #2 (December 1996). He would eventually write for some of the highest-profile characters at Marvel, including the X-Men, Spider-Man, and Captain America. He would also write Batman and Green Lantern for DC Comics, and Buffy the Vampire Slayer Season Eight for Dark Horse Comics.

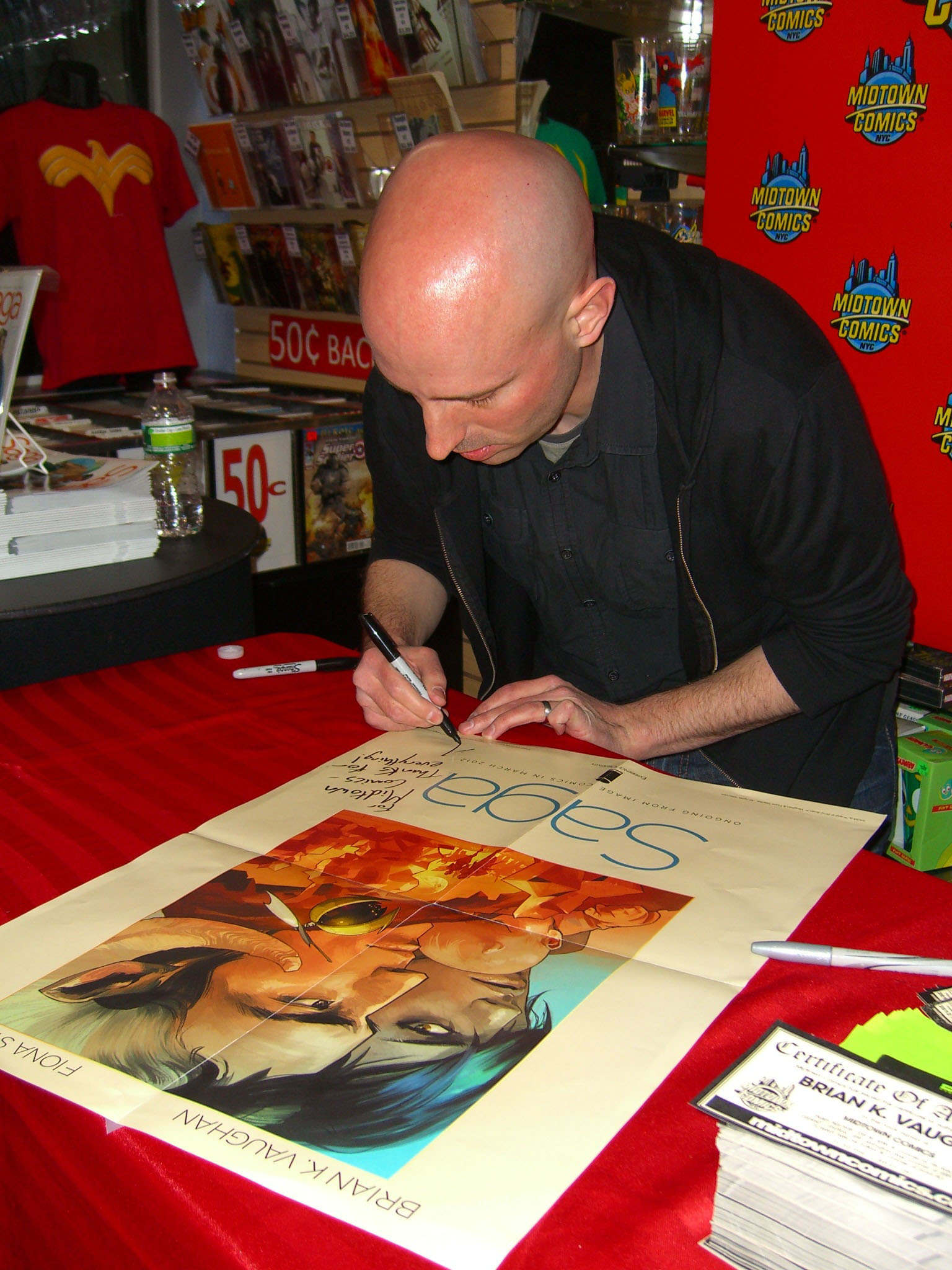
Vaughan signing a poster for his creator-owned series, Saga

From 2002 to 2008, Vaughan, who came to prefer writing his own characters, wrote the creator-owned monthly series Y: The Last Man, a post-apocalyptic science fiction series about the only man to survive the apparent simultaneous death of every male mammal on Earth. The series was published in sixty issues by Vertigo and collected in a series of ten paperback volumes (and later a series of five hardcover "Deluxe" volumes). The series received Eisner Awards in 2005 and 2008, and numerous other nominations. The film rights to the series were acquired by New Line Cinema. Vaughan wrote his own screenplay for the project, though it was reported in March 2012 that Matthew Federman and Stephen Scaia were in final negotiations to write their own version.

In 2006, Vaughan published the graphic novel Pride of Baghdad, which centers on a group of lions who escape from an Iraqi zoo after the start of the Iraq War. The book was praised by IGN, who named it the Best Original Graphic Novel of 2006, calling it a "modern classic", lauding it for combining a tale of survival and family with a powerful analogy of war, and praising Vaughan for representing various viewpoints through the different lion characters.

From 2004 to 2010 Vaughan wrote another creator-owned series, Ex Machina, a political thriller that depicts the life of Mitchell Hundred, a former superhero known as the Great Machine who, in the wake of his heroism during the September 11, 2001 attacks, is elected Mayor of New York City. The story is set during Hundred's term in office, and interwoven with flashbacks to his past as the Great Machine. Through this, the series explores both the political situations Hundred finds himself in, and the mysteries surrounding his superpowers. New Line Cinema purchased the film rights to the series in July 2005, and commissioned Vaughan to write one of the two commissioned scripts, which he was reported to be working on in 2007. Following the conclusion of Ex Machina in 2010, Vaughan reiterated his previous statement that he would concentrate on creator-owned work, saying, "I realized when I turned in this final Ex Machina script that it would be the first time I wasn't under some kind of deadline at Marvel or DC since 1996. That's a huge chunk of my life to spend with those characters. I love them, and I still read Marvel and DC's superhero books. I just think I'm better when I'm working on my own creations. When there are so many talented creators out there who are better at that stuff than me, I should leave those characters to them. I should do what I'm fortunate enough to be in the position to do, which is to create more new stuff."

Vaughan was a writer, executive story editor and producer for seasons 3 to 5 on the ABC TV series Lost, a job he earned on the basis of his work on Y: The Last Man, of which Lost co-creator and executive producer Damon Lindelof was an ardent fan. Lindelof showed that book to series showrunner and executive producer Carlton Cuse. Lindelof relates, "And I told him, 'We need a guy like this on the show, but I don't think he'd ever do it. I don't think he even works in L.A.' And the next thing we knew, he was on the show." He began his stint on the series as executive story editor with the episode "The Man from Tallahassee", which premiered in March 2007. Vaughan continued as story editor on several episodes until he began writing episodes, beginning with the episode "Catch-22", which Vaughan co-wrote with Jeff Pinkner, and premiered in April that year. That episode was praised by Wired writer Erik Malinowski, who stated that the themes that Vaughan carried over to Lost from his comics work, including intricately crafted storylines typified by pathos and hope, as well as pop culture references, redeemed that series' third season.

Vaughan would write a total of 7 episodes, the last of which was the April 2009 episode "Dead Is Dead". He was first credited as a producer with the fourth-season premiere "The Beginning of the End", eventually acting as producer on a total of 29 episodes. He was also a co-producer on Lost: Missing Pieces, a spinoff Internet short film series produced during the hiatus between the show's third and fourth seasons.

In November 2011 Steven Spielberg selected Vaughan to adapt the Stephen King novel Under the Dome into a television series for Showtime, which is Vaughan's first television work since Lost. Vaughan was the showrunner and executive producer of the series. He exited the show before the second season premiered in 2014.

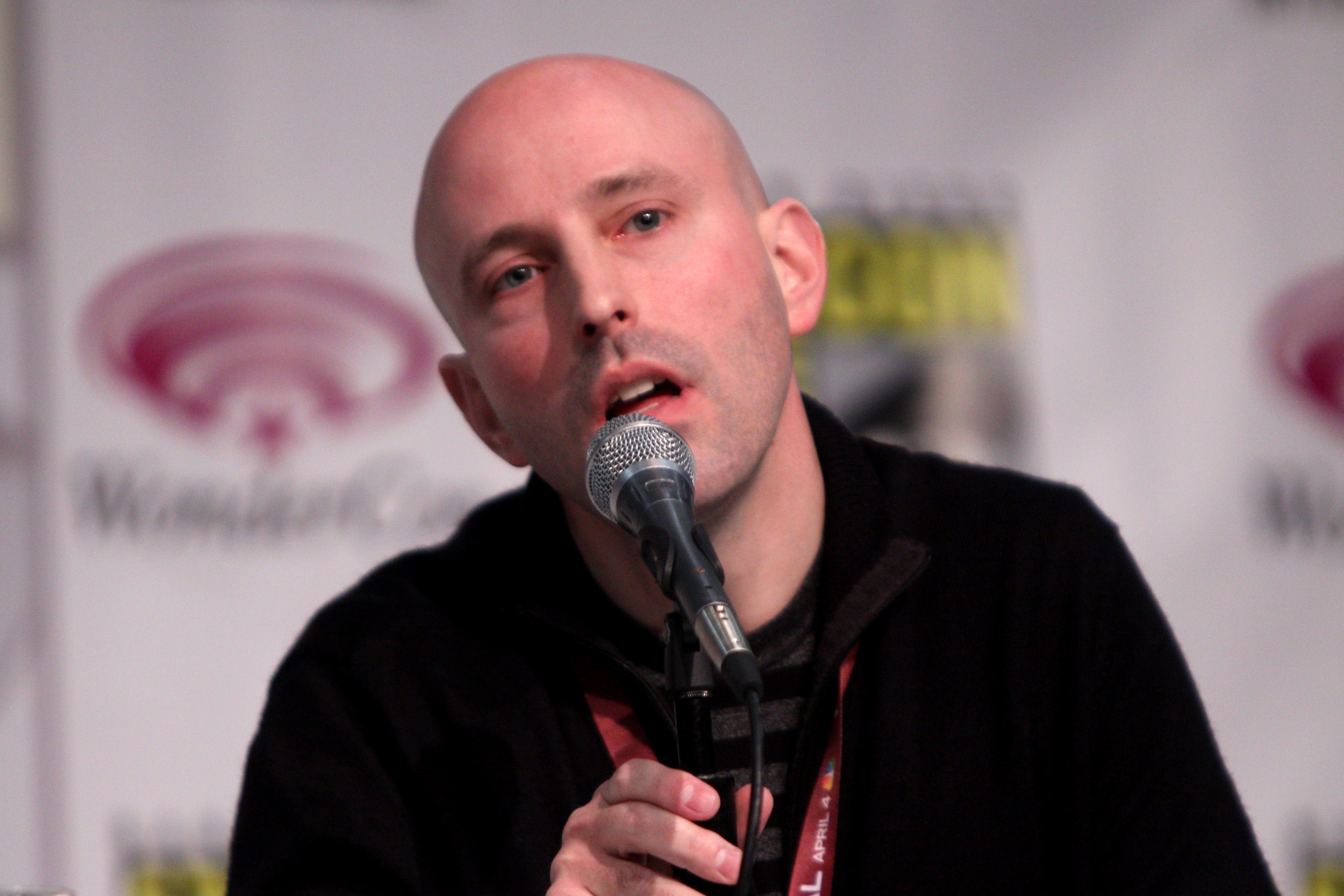
Vaughan speaking on a panel at the 2013 WonderCon

On March 14, 2012, Image Comics published the first issue of Vaughan and Fiona Staples' epic space opera/fantasy series Saga, which he conceived to be a concept strictly relegated to comics, and not adapted to other media. Although Vaughan was a child when he first conceived of the ideas for the book – which owes its inspiration to Star Wars – it was not until his wife became pregnant with his second child that he began to write the series, which harbors parenthood as an underlying theme. The series depicts two aliens from warring races trying to survive with their newborn daughter. The book is Vaughan's first publication for Image Comics, and represents the first time he has employed first-person narration in his comics writing. The first issue sold out of its first printing ahead of its March 14 release date, with a second printing ordered for April 11, the same release date for issue #2. The series has received positive reviews from MTV, Ain't it Cool News, Comic Book Resources, IGN, Publishers Weekly and Time magazine. It has also appeared on the New York Times Graphic Books Best Seller List, won three 2013 Eisner Awards, won a Hugo Award and was nominated for seven Harvey Awards.

In March 2013, Vaughan published the first issue of The Private Eye with artist Marcos Martín on Panel Syndicate, a pay-what-you-want host for their creative efforts. Panel Syndicate offers DRM-free comics available for purchase/download for whatever price readers wish to pay. Through Panel Syndicate, Vaughan and Martin published 10 issues of The Private Eye and released the first issue of Barrier in late 2015.

At the Image Expo in January 2015, it was announced that Vaughan would release two new books through Image Comics in 2015: Paper Girls with Cliff Chiang and Matthew Wilson, and We Stand On Guard with Steve Skroce.

== Personal life ==
Vaughan and his wife, a native of Ottawa, Ontario, Canada and playwright, live in Los Angeles. They have two children and a pet Dachshund named Hamburger that has been repeatedly referenced as Vaughan's aide in selecting letters for the Saga letter column. Hamburger has also appeared in an illustration of Vaughan and Fiona Staples that was included in a 2013 Time magazine story on Saga.

== Awards and nominations ==
Year	Award	Category	Work	Result	Ref.
2005	Eisner Awards	Best New Series	Ex Machina (with Tony Harris, and Tom Feister)	Won	
2005	Eisner Awards	Best Writer	Y: The Last Man, Runaways, Ex Machina	Won	
2005	Eisner Awards	Best Single Issue or One-Shot	Ex Machina #1: "The Pilot" (with Tony Harris, and Tom Feister)	Nominated	
2005	Eisner Awards	Best Serialized Story	Ex Machina #2-5: "State of Emergency" (with Tony Harris, and Tom Feister)	Nominated	
2005	Eisner Awards	Best Serialized Story	Y: The Last Man #18-20: "Safeword" (with Pia Guerra and José Marzan Jr.)	Nominated	
2005	Eisner Awards	Best Continuing Series	Y: The Last Man (with Pia Guerra and José Marzan Jr.)	Nominated	
2006	Eisner Awards	Best Single Issue or One-Shot	Ex Machina #11: "Fortune Favors" (with Tony Harris, and Tom Feister)	Nominated	
2006	Eisner Awards	Best Serialized Story	Ex Machina #12–14: "Fact v. Fiction" (with Tony Harris and Tom Feister)	Nominated	
2006	Eisner Awards	Best Serialized Story	Y: The Last Man #37–39: "Paper Dolls" (with Pia Guerra, Goran Sudžuka, and José Marzan Jr.)	Nominated	
2006	Eisner Awards	Best Continuing Series	Ex Machina (with Tony Harris, and Tom Feister)	Nominated	
2006	Eisner Awards	Best Writer	Ex Machina, Y: The Last Man and Runaways	Nominated	
2006	Harvey Awards	Best Continuing Series or Limited Series	Runaways	Won	
2006	Joe Shuster Awards	Outstanding International Creator		Won	
2007	Harvey Awards	Best Single Issue or Story	Pride of Baghdad (with Niko Henrichon)	Won	
2007	Harvey Awards	Best Writer	Y: The Last Man	Nominated	
2007	Harvey Awards	Best Graphic Album of Original Work	Pride of Baghdad (with Niko Henrichon)	Nominated	
2007	Joe Shuster Awards	Outstanding International Creator Award		Won	
2007	Wired Rave Awards	Print: The Storyteller		Won	
2008	Eisner Awards	Best Continuing Series	Y: The Last Man (with Pia Guerra and Jose Marzan, Jr.)	Won	
2008	Eisner Awards	Best New Series	Buffy the Vampire Slayer Season Eight (with Joss Whedon, Georges Jeanty and Andy Owens)	Won	
2008	Eisner Awards	Best Writer	Buffy the Vampire Slayer Season Eight, Ex Machina, and Y: The Last Man	Nominated	
2008	Harvey Awards	Best Writer	Y: The Last Man	Won	
2009	Hugo Awards	Best Graphic Story	Y: The Last Man, Volume 10: Whys and Wherefores	Nominated	
2009	Harvey Awards	Best Single Issue or Story	Y: The Last Man #60 (with Pia Guerra)	Won	
2013	Hugo Award	Best Graphic Story	Saga (with Fiona Staples)	Won	
2013	Eisner Awards	Best Writer	Saga (with Fiona Staples)	Won	
2013	Eisner Awards	Best New Series	Saga (with Fiona Staples)	Won	
2013	Eisner Awards	Best Continuing Series	Saga (with Fiona Staples)	Won	
2013	Harvey Awards	Best Writer	Saga (with Fiona Staples)	Won	
2013	Harvey Awards	Best New Series	Saga (with Fiona Staples)	Won	
2013	Harvey Awards	Best Continuing Series or Limited Series	Saga (with Fiona Staples)	Won	
2013	British Fantasy Award	Best Comic/Graphic Novel	Saga (with Fiona Staples)	Won	
2014	Hugo Awards	Best Graphic Story	Saga (with Fiona Staples)	Nominated	
2014	Eisner Awards	Best Writer	Saga (with Fiona Staples)	Won	
2014	Eisner Awards	Best Continuing Series	Saga (with Fiona Staples)	Won	
2014	Harvey Awards	Best Writer	Saga (with Fiona Staples)	Won	
2014	Harvey Awards	Best Continuing or Limited Series	Saga (with Fiona Staples)	Won	
2015	Hugo Awards	Best Graphic Story	Saga, Volume 2 (with Fiona Staples)	Nominated	
2015	Eisner Awards	Best Writer	Saga (with Fiona Staples)	Nominated	
2015	Eisner Awards	Best Continuing Series	Saga (with Fiona Staples)	Won	
2015	Eisner Awards	Best Limited Series	The Private Eye (with Marcos Martin and Muntsa Vicente)	Nominated	
2015	Eisner Awards	Best Digital Comic/Webcomic	The Private Eye (with Marcos Martin and Muntsa Vicente)	Won	
2015	Harvey Awards	Best Writer	Saga (with Fiona Staples)	Nominated	
2015	Harvey Awards	Best Continuing or Limited Series	Saga (with Fiona Staples)	Won	
2015	Harvey Awards	Best Online Comics Work	The Private Eye (with Marcos Martin and Muntsa Vicente)	Won	
2016	Eisner Awards	Best New Series	Paper Girls (with Cliff Chiang)	Won	
2016	Harvey Awards	Best New Series	Paper Girls (with Cliff Chiang)	Won	
2016	Harvey Awards	Best Writer	Saga (with Fiona Staples)	Won	
2016	Harvey Awards	Best Continuing or Limited Series	Saga (with Fiona Staples)	Won	
2017	Hugo Awards	Best Graphic Story	Saga, Volume 6 (with Fiona Staples)	Nominated	
2017	Hugo Awards	Best Graphic Story	Paper Girls, Volume 1 (with Cliff Chiang, Matt Wilson, and Jared Fletcher)	Nominated	
2017	Eisner Awards	Best Writer	Paper Girls, Saga, We Stand On Guard	Won	
2017	Eisner Awards	Best Continuing Series	Saga (with Fiona Staples)	Won	
2018	Hugo Awards	Best Graphic Story	Saga, Volume 7 (with Fiona Staples)	Nominated	
2018	Hugo Awards	Best Graphic Story	Paper Girls, Volume 3 (with Cliff Chiang, Matt Wilson, and Jared Fletcher)	Nominated	
2018	Eisner Awards	Best Digital Comic	Barrier (with Marcos Martin)	Nominated	
2018	Harvey Award	Digital Book of the Year	Barrier (with Marcos Martin)	Won	
2019	Hugo Awards	Best Graphic Story	Saga, Volume 8 (with Fiona Staples)	Nominated	
2019	Hugo Awards	Best Graphic Story	Paper Girls, Volume 4 (with Cliff Chiang, Matt Wilson, and Jared Fletcher)	Nominated	
2020	Hugo Awards	Best Graphic Story	Paper Girls, Volume 6 (with Cliff Chiang, Matt Wilson, and Jared Fletcher)	Nominated	
2023	Hugo Awards	Best Graphic Story	Saga, Volume 10 (with Fiona Staples)	Nominated	
2024	Hugo Awards	Best Graphic Story	Saga, Volume 11 (with Fiona Staples)	Won	

== Bibliography ==
=== Marvel Comics ===
- X-Men:
  - Tales from the Age of Apocalypse #2: "Sinister Bloodlines" (with Steve Epting and Nick Napolitano, 1997)
    - Scripted by Vaughan, plotted by John Francis Moore.
    - Collected in X-Men: The Complete Age of Apocalypse Volume 1 (tpb, 376 pages, 2006, ISBN 0-7851-1714-8)
    - Collected in X-Men: The Age of Apocalypse Omnibus Companion (hc, 992 pages, 2014, ISBN 0-7851-8514-3)
  - Cable #43: "Broken Soldiers" (co-written by Vaughan and Todd Dezago, art by Randy Green and Chap Yaep, 1997)
  - Wolverine vol. 2 #131 (co-written by Vaughan and Todd Dezago, art by Cary Nord, 1998)
    - Collected in Wolverine: Blood Wedding (tpb, 320 pages, 2013, ISBN 0-7851-8524-0)
    - Collected in WWolverine: Not Dead Yet Omnibus (hc, 1,392 pages, 2026, ISBN 1-30296-863-7)
  - X-Men Unlimited #22: "Cat and Mouse" (with Patrick Gleason, anthology, 1999) collected in X-Men: The Hunt for Professor X (tpb, 368 pages, 2015, ISBN 0-7851-9720-6)
  - Icons: Cyclops #1–4: "Odyssey" (with Mark Texeira, 2001)
  - Icons: Chamber #1–4: "The Hollow Man" (with Lee Ferguson, 2002–2003)
  - X-Men 2 Movie Prequel: Wolverine (with Tom Mandrake, one-shot, 2003) collected in X-Men 2: The Movie Adaptation (tpb, 144 pages, 2003, ISBN 0-7851-1162-X)
  - Mystique (with Jorge Lucas, Michael Ryan and Manuel García (#11–12), Tsunami, 2003–2004) collected as:
    - Drop Dead Gorgeous (collects #1–6, tpb, 144 pages, 2004, ISBN 0-7851-1240-5)
    - Tinker, Tailor, Mutant, Spy (collects #7–13, tpb, 168 pages, 2004, ISBN 0-7851-1555-2)
    - Ultimate Collection: Mystique by Brian K. Vaughan (collects #1–13, tpb, 312 pages, 2011, ISBN 0-7851-5511-2)
  - Ultimate X-Men (with Brandon Peterson, Andy Kubert, Stuart Immonen, Steve Dillon (#58) and Tom Raney (Annual), 2004–2006) collected as:
    - Ultimate Collection: Ultimate X-Men Volume 5 (collects #46–57, hc, 312 pages, 2005, ISBN 0-7851-2103-X; tpb, 2015, ISBN 0-7851-9292-1)
    - Ultimate Collection: Ultimate X-Men Volume 6 (collects #58–65 and Annual #1, hc, 256 pages, 2006, ISBN 0-7851-2104-8)
    - Ultimate X-Men Omnibus Volume 2 (collects #46–65 and Annual #1, hc, 1,160 pages, 2024, ISBN 1-3029-5011-8)
  - Logan #1–3 (with Eduardo Risso, Marvel Knights, 2008) collected as Logan (hc, 112 pages, 2008, ISBN 0-7851-3425-5; tpb, 2009, ISBN 0-7851-3414-X)
- Ka-Zar Annual '97: "The Shadow of Death" (with Walter A. McDaniel, 1997) collected in Ka-Zar Volume 2 (tpb, 216 pages, 2012, ISBN 0-7851-5992-4)
- What If...? vol. 2 #112: "New York... The New Savage Land... No Escape!" (with Koi Turnbull, anthology, 1998)
- Captain America: Sentinel of Liberty (hc, 360 pages, 2011, ISBN 0-7851-4963-5) includes:
  - Captain America: Sentinel of Liberty (anthology):
    - "The Great Pretender" (script by Vaughan from a plot by Mark Waid, art by Doug Braithwaite, in #5, 1999)
    - "An Ending" (with N. Steven Harris, in #7, 1999)
- The Hood #1–6 (with Kyle Hotz, Marvel MAX, 2002) collected as The Hood: Blood from Stones (tpb, 144 pages, 2003, ISBN 0-7851-1058-5; hc, 2007, ISBN 0-7851-2818-2)
- 411 #2: "The Clarion Call" (with Leonardo Manco, anthology, 2003)
- Runaways (with Adrian Alphona, Takeshi Miyazawa and Mike Norton (vol. 2 #19–21), Tsunami, 2003–2007) collected as:
  - Runaways: The Complete Collection Volume 1 (collects vol. 1 #1–18, tpb, 448 pages, 2014, ISBN 0-7851-8558-5)
  - Runaways: The Complete Collection Volume 2 (collects vol. 2 #1–18, tpb, 472 pages, 2014, ISBN 0-7851-8784-7)
    - Includes the title feature from the Free Comic Book Day 2006: X-Men/Runaways special (written by Vaughan, art by Skottie Young, 2006)
  - Runaways: The Complete Collection Volume 3 (includes vol. 2 #19–24, tpb, 528 pages, 2015, ISBN 0-7851-8917-3)
  - Runaways by Brian K. Vaughan and Adrian Alphona Omnibus (collects vol. 1 #1–18, vol. 2 #1–24 and the X-Men/Runaways special, hc, 1,072 pages, 2018, ISBN 1-302-91218-6)
- Doctor Octopus: Negative Exposure #1–5 (with Staz Johnson, 2003–2004) collected as Spider-Man/Doctor Octopus: Negative Exposure (tpb, 120 pages, 2004, ISBN 0-7851-1330-4)
- Wha... Huh? (with Jim Mahfood, among other writers, one-shot, 2005) collected in Secret Wars Too (tpb, 208 pages, 2016, ISBN 1-302-90211-3)
- Doctor Strange: The Oath #1–5 (with Marcos Martín, 2006–2007) collected as Doctor Strange: The Oath (tpb, 128 pages, 2007, ISBN 0-7851-2211-7)

=== DC Comics ===
- Batman: False Faces (hc, 160 pages, 2008, ISBN 1-4012-1640-4; tpb, 2009, ISBN 1-4012-2228-5) collects:
  - Gotham City Secret Files: "Skull-Duggery" (with Marcos Martín, co-feature in one-shot, 2000)
  - Wonder Woman vol. 2 #160–161: "A Piece of You" (with Scott Kolins, 2000)
  - Batman #588–590: "Close Before Striking" (with Scott McDaniel, 2001)
  - Detective Comics #787: "Mimsy Were the Borogoves" (with Rick Burchett, 2003)
- The Titans #14 (co-written by Vaughan and Devin K. Grayson, art by Cully Hamner, 2000)
- Young Justice (with Scott Kolins):
  - Sins of Youth: Wonder Girls (one-shot, 2000) collected in Young Justice: Sins of Youth (tpb, 320 pages, 2000, ISBN 1-56389-748-2)
  - Young Justice #22: "Other Interests" (co-feature, 2000) collected in Young Justice Book Four (tpb, 320 pages, 2019, ISBN 1-4012-9500-2)
- JLA Annual #4: "Ruins" (with Steve Scott, 2000)
- Superman vol. 2 Annual #12: "Whispers of the Earth" (with Carlo Barberi, 2000)
  - Dialogue by Vaughan, story by Oscar Pinto and Francisco Haghenbeck.
- Green Lantern: Circle of Fire (tpb, 224 pages, 2002, ISBN 1-56389-806-3) includes:
  - Green Lantern: Circle of Fire #1–2 (with Norm Breyfogle and Robert Teranishi, 2000)
  - Green Lantern/Adam Strange: "We Rann All Night" (with Cary Nord, one-shot, 2000)
  - Green Lantern/Atom: "Unusual Suspects" (with Trevor McCarthy, one-shot, 2000)
- 9-11 Volume 2: "For Art's Sake" (with Pete Woods, anthology graphic novel, 224 pages, 2002, ISBN 1-56389-878-0)
- Superman/Batman #26 (with Tim Sale, two-page sequence among other writers and artists, 2006) collected in Superman/Batman Volume 2 (tpb, 336 pages, 2014, ISBN 1-4012-5079-3)

==== Vertigo ====
- Swamp Thing vol. 3 (with Roger Petersen and Giuseppe Camuncoli, 2000–2001) collected as:
  - Swamp Thing by Brian K. Vaughan Volume 1 (collects #1–9, tpb, 240 pages, 2014, ISBN 1-4012-4304-5)
    - Includes the "Sow and Ye Shall Reap" short story (art by Roger Petersen) from Vertigo: Winter's Edge #3 (anthology, 2000)
    - Includes the "Bitter Fruit" short story (art by Cliff Chiang) and profile pages from the Vertigo Secret Files & Origins: Swamp Thing one-shot (2000)
  - Swamp Thing by Brian K. Vaughan Volume 2 (collects #10–20 and profile pages from the Secret Files & Origins one-shot, tpb, 264 pages, 2014, ISBN 1-4012-4598-6)
- Y: The Last Man (with Pia Guerra, Paul Chadwick (#16–17), Goran Parlov (#21–23) and Goran Sudžuka (#32–35, 40–42, 47–48, 53–54), 2002–2008) collected as:
  - Book One (collects #1–10, hc, 256 pages, 2008, ISBN 1-4012-1921-7; tpb, 2014, ISBN 1-4012-5151-X)
  - Book Two (collects #11–23, hc, 320 pages, 2009, ISBN 1-4012-2235-8; tpb, 2015, ISBN 1-4012-5439-X)
  - Book Three (collects #24–36, hc, 320 pages, 2010, ISBN 1-4012-2578-0; tpb, 2015, ISBN 1-4012-5880-8)
  - Book Four (collects #37–48, hc, 296 pages, 2010, ISBN 1-4012-2888-7; tpb, 2016, ISBN 1-4012-6168-X)
  - Book Five (collects #49–60, hc, 320 pages, 2011, ISBN 1-4012-3051-2; tpb, 2016, ISBN 1-4012-6372-0)
  - Absolute Edition Volume 1 (collects #1–20, hc, 512 pages, 2015, ISBN 1-4012-5429-2)
  - Absolute Edition Volume 2 (collects #21–40, hc, 256 pages, 2016, ISBN 1-4012-6491-3)
  - Absolute Edition Volume 3 (collects #41–60, hc, 544 pages, 2017, ISBN 1-4012-7100-6)
  - Omnibus (collects #1–60, hc, 1,440 pages, DC Black Label, 2019, ISBN 1-40129-815-X)
  - Compendium One (collects #1–31, tpb, 728 pages, DC Black Label, 2020, ISBN 1-77950-453-5)
  - Compendium Two (collects #32–60, tpb, 704 pages, DC Black Label, 2022, ISBN 1-77951-608-8)
- Pride of Baghdad (with Niko Henrichon, graphic novel, 136 pages, 2006, ISBN 1-4012-0314-0)

==== Wildstorm ====
- Ex Machina (with Tony Harris, 2004–2010) collected as:
  - Book One (collects #1–11, hc, 272 pages, 2008, ISBN 1-4012-1814-8; tpb, 2014, ISBN 1-4012-4498-X)
  - Book Two (collects #12–20, hc, 272 pages, 2009, ISBN 1-4012-2677-9; tpb, 2014, ISBN 1-4012-4691-5)
    - Includes the first two issues of Ex Machina Special (written by Vaughan, art by Chris Sprouse, 2006)
  - Book Three (collects #21–29, hc, 272 pages, 2010, ISBN 1-4012-2800-3; tpb, 2014, ISBN 1-4012-5003-3)
    - Includes the third issue of Ex Machina Special (written by Vaughan, art by John Paul Leon, 2007)
    - Includes the Inside the Machine one-shot that offers a look behind the creation of issue #23 (2007)
  - Book Four (collects #30–40, hc, 272 pages, 2010, ISBN 1-4012-2845-3; tpb, 2015, ISBN 1-4012-5002-5)
  - Book Five (collects #41–50, hc, 320 pages, 2011, ISBN 1-4012-2999-9; tpb, 2015, ISBN 1-4012-5422-5)
    - Includes the fourth issue of Ex Machina Special (written by Vaughan, art by John Paul Leon, 2009)
  - The Complete Series Omnibus (collects #1–50, Special #1–4 and the Inside the Machine one-shot, hc, 1,440 pages, 2018, ISBN 1-4012-8068-4)
- Tom Strong #28: "A Fire in His Belly" (with Peter Snejbjerg, America's Best Comics, 2004)
  - Collected in Tom Strong Book Five (hc, 136 pages, 2005, ISBN 1-4012-0624-7; tpb, 2006, ISBN 1-4012-0625-5)
  - Collected in Tom Strong Compendium Book One (tpb, 952 pages, DC Comics, 2023, ISBN 1-779-52172-3)
- Midnighter #7: "Fait Accompli" (with Darick Robertson, 2007) collected in Midnighter: The Complete Wildstorm Series (tpb, 512 pages, 2017, ISBN 1-4012-6791-2)

=== Image Comics ===
- Noble Causes: Extended Family #1: "The Widow" (with Mitch Breitweiser, anthology, 2003) collected in Noble Causes Archives Volume 2 (tpb, 598 pages, 2009, ISBN 1-58240-931-5)
- Saga (with Fiona Staples, 2012–ongoing) collected as:
  - Book One (collects #1–18, hc, 504 pages, 2014, ISBN 1-63215-078-6)
  - Book Two (collects #19–36, hc, 464 pages, 2017, ISBN 1-63215-903-1)
  - Book Three (collects #37–54, hc, 504 pages, 2019, ISBN 1-5343-1221-8)
  - Book Four (collects #55–72, hc, 488 pages, 2026, ISBN 1-5343-3260-X)
  - Compendium One (collects #1–54, tpb, 1,328 pages, 2019, ISBN 1-5343-1346-X)
- We Stand On Guard #1–6 (with Steve Skroce, 2015) collected as We Stand On Guard (hc, 168 pages, 2016, ISBN 1-63215-702-0; tpb, 2017, ISBN 1-5343-0141-0)
- Paper Girls (with Cliff Chiang, 2015–2019) collected as:
  - Book One (collects #1–10, hc, 320 pages, 2017, ISBN 1-5343-0334-0)
  - Book Two (collects #11–20, hc, 288 pages, 2019, ISBN 1-5343-1061-4)
  - Book Three (collects #21–30, hc, 320 pages, 2020, ISBN 1-5343-1648-5)
  - The Complete Story (collects #1–30, tpb, 800 pages, 2021, ISBN 1-5343-1999-9)

=== Other publishers ===
- Dark Horse:
  - The Escapist:
    - Michael Chabon Presents: The Amazing Adventures of the Escapist (anthology):
      - "To Reign in Hell" (with Roger Petersen, in #3, 2004) collected in The Amazing Adventures of the Escapist Volume 2 (tpb, 160 pages, 2004, ISBN 1-59307-172-8)
      - "The Escapists, Part 1" (with Eduardo Barreto and Philip Bond, in #8, 2005)
    - The Escapists #1–6 (with Jason Shawn Alexander and Steve Rolston, 2006) collected as The Escapists (hc, 208 pages, 2007, ISBN 1-59307-831-5; tpb, 160 pages, 2009, ISBN 1-59582-361-1)
  - Buffy the Vampire Slayer Season Eight #6–9: "No Future for You" (with Georges Jeanty, 2007) collected in Buffy the Vampire Slayer Season Eight Volume 1 (hc, 304 pages, 2012, ISBN 1-59582-888-5)
- Panel Syndicate (a platform for digital comics co-founded by Vaughan):
  - The Private Eye #1–10 (with Marcos Martín, 2013–2015) collected in print as The Private Eye (hc, 300 pages, Image, 2015, ISBN 1-63215-572-9; tpb, 2025, ISBN 1-53433-164-6)
  - Barrier #1–5 (with Marcos Martín, 2015–2017)
    - The series was first published in print by Image as a 5-issue limited series titled Barrier (2018)
    - Collected as Barrier (tpb, 208 pages, Image, 2026, ISBN 1-5343-3145-X)
  - The Walking Dead: The Alien (with Marcos Martín, one-shot, 2016) published in print as The Walking Dead: The Alien (hc, 72 pages, Image, 2020, ISBN 1-5343-1659-0)
- Spectators (with Niko Henrichon, webcomic published via Substack, 2022–2024) collected in print as Spectators (hc, 344 pages, Image, 2025, ISBN 1-53433-121-2)
- Battle Action vol. 3 #1: "The Septic" (with Chris Burnham, anthology, Rebellion, 2024) collected in Battle Action Volume 3 (hc, 144 pages, 2025, ISBN 1-8378-6544-2)

== Filmography ==
=== Television ===
- Lost (2006–2009)
  - 3.17 – "Catch-22" – April 18, 2007 (with Jeff Pinkner)
    - Missing Piece #3 (PC #101) – "King of the Castle" – November 20, 2007
    - Missing Piece #5 (PC #106) – "Operation: Sleeper" – December 3, 2007
  - 4.02 – "Confirmed Dead" – February 7, 2008 (with Drew Goddard)
  - 4.08 – "Meet Kevin Johnson" – March 20, 2008 (with Elizabeth Sarnoff)
  - 4.09 – "The Shape of Things to Come" – April 24, 2008 (with Drew Goddard)
  - 5.04 – "The Little Prince" – February 4, 2009 (with Melinda Hsu Taylor)
  - 5.09 – "Namaste" – March 18, 2009 (with Paul Zbyszewski)
  - 5.12 – "Dead is Dead" – April 8, 2009 (with Elizabeth Sarnoff)
- Under the Dome (2013-2014) – show runner, executive producer, writer
- Runaways (2017)
  - 1.1 – "Reunion" – November 21, 2017 (co-producer, characters and story)
  - 1.2 – "Rewind" – November 21, 2017 (co-producer, characters and story)

=== Film ===
- Dune: Part Three (2026) – Co-writer (with Denis Villeneuve)

Preceded by Mark Millar	Swamp Thing writer 2000–2001	Succeeded by Andy Diggle
Preceded by n/a	Runaways writer 2003–2007	Succeeded by Joss Whedon
Preceded by Brian Michael Bendis	Ultimate X-Men writer 2004–2006	Succeeded by Robert Kirkman
