= Catch-22 (Lost) =

- Lost episode
- Episode no.: Season 3 Episode 17
- Directed by: Stephen Williams
- Written by: Jeff Pinkner; Brian K. Vaughan
- Production code: 317
- Original air date: April 18, 2007
- Running time: 41 minutes

Guest appearances
- Sonya Walger as Penny Widmore; Andrew Connolly as Brother Campbell; Marsha Thomason as Naomi Dorrit; Joanna Bool as Ruth; Jack Maxwell as Derek; Andrew Trask as Brother Martin

Episode chronology
← Previous "One of Us"	Next → "D.O.C."
- Lost season 3

"Catch-22" is the 17th episode of the third season of Lost, and the 66th episode overall. It was aired in the United States on April 18, 2007, on ABC. The episode was written by Jeff Pinkner and Brian K. Vaughan, and directed by Stephen Williams. The character of Desmond Hume (Henry Ian Cusick) is featured in the episode's flashbacks.

== Plot ==
=== Flashbacks ===
Flashbacks in this episode show Desmond ending his test period of silence after joining a monastery. He is greeted by Brother Campbell, who welcomes him to the abbey. The two quickly get along, and one day they are applying the labels for wine bottles. While they are talking, a monk enters and informs Desmond of a visitor. A man then enters and punches Desmond before leaving. Desmond decides to visit an old flame, whom he was supposed to marry after six years of dating, but jilted her a week before the wedding to become a monk. Derek, the man who assaulted him, answers the door, but is quickly interrupted by Ruth, Desmond's old love. She invites him in, where he explains that he was called to join the monastery. However, Ruth accuses him of being scared and accuses him of not having the decency to come clean when breaking up with a woman. Later that night, Desmond gets drunk on the wine that he helped label. Brother Campbell catches him and informs him that he is not cut out for the monastery. However, the next day, he asks Desmond to help load the crates of wine into the car of a customer. (As Desmond is talking to Brother Campbell, the scene shows a picture on his desk of Brother Campbell and Eloise Hawking.) As he wheels them out, he meets the customer, Penelope Widmore, who offers to take him with her.

=== On the Island ===
The episode starts off with Desmond, Hugo "Hurley" Reyes, Jin-Soo Kwon and Charlie Pace walking through the jungle, talking about superheroes, when Charlie suddenly springs one of Rousseau's traps, and is consequently shot in the throat by an arrow. Desmond tries to give him aid, but Charlie dies in his arms. We then see a string of short flashbacks - Hurley lifting a cable out of the sand, a red light dropping from the sky, Jin and Charlie holding a parachute in the jungle, and a person stuck in a tree.

The view then returns to Desmond fishing on the beach, revealing that it was all one of Desmond's visions. He looks over to see that Charlie is still alive and well. Desmond approaches Hurley and asks him to take him to the cable. Hurley pretends not to know anything, but eventually Desmond coaxes him into telling him, and also asks him to go with him on a hike. The two visit Jack to pick up a first-aid kit, with Desmond telling him that he has a sprained ankle. Jack is skeptical at first, but eventually hands it over. Hurley then demands that Desmond tells him what he's up to. Desmond explains that he experienced more visions, but they weren't shown in order, so everything needs to happen exactly as it appeared.

Meanwhile, Kate is approached by Sawyer in her tent while she is changing, and he asks her if Jack knows about their fling while in captivity. She explains that Jack saw them having sex through the surveillance monitors. Sawyer tries flirting with her, but Kate playfully shrugs him off.

Desmond gets Hurley to speak with Jin, who comes along after being told about a "camping trip." Desmond then approaches Charlie with the same story, but Charlie sees through this and questions him about his visions. Desmond gives in and explains, but only a limited amount to convince Charlie to come along. They walk along the beach, up until the point where Hurley first discovered the cable. Desmond suggests that they camp out here until the next morning, causing Charlie to become wary.

Meanwhile, back at the camp, Kate and Jack have a talk in the kitchen, and reminisce about days on the island. Kate tries communicating with Jack and tries to get things back to normal between the two, but he asks to use her spoon and heads off to Juliet's tent where he eats dinner with her. Kate becomes upset, so she goes to Sawyer's tent and seduces him.

"Camping trip" company is enjoying a ghost story told by Jin (in Korean), while gathered around a campfire. Charlie notices Desmond is looking at the photo of him and Penny. Charlie asks how he could leave someone so beautiful. Desmond replies that he is a coward. Their conversation is interrupted by the sound of an approaching helicopter. Thinking that they are being rescued, they suddenly notice the helicopter doesn't sound right, and they hear it crash into the ocean. Jin, however, spots a beacon flashing in the sky, landing somewhere in the jungle. Desmond is eager to follow, but Charlie suggests they wait until morning. Reluctantly, Desmond agrees.

Jack and Juliet talk as they continue to construct her tent back on the beach. They are soon confronted by Sawyer, who challenges Jack to a game of ping-pong. When Sawyer says how strange it is to be back, Jack reveals that he spoke with Kate the night before, but ate supper with Juliet.

The next morning, Desmond, Charlie, Jin and Hurley venture off into the jungle. Charlie stumbles across a small Hawaiian doll, which they at first mistake for one of Rousseau's traps. Desmond then discovers a rucksack wedged in a tree above Hurley and retrieves it. Inside, they find a satellite phone, which has stopped working, and a book titled Ardil-22 (the Portuguese translation of Joseph Heller's novel Catch-22). Inside, Desmond finds a perfect copy of the photograph with him and Penny, causing him and Charlie to suspect that Penny is the person who parachuted on the island.

Sawyer confronts Kate and gives her a cassette tape (the Best of Phil Collins), which he stole from Bernard. He then questions her about why she jumped him, asking her if she was upset about Jack and Juliet. Sawyer accuses her of using him and tells her "all you have to do is ask" before walking away, leaving her upset.

Still in the jungle, Desmond and Charlie discuss his reasons for bringing them on the hike. It soon starts raining, and Desmond is eager for the group to pick up the pace. Hurley and Charlie discuss who is faster, Superman or The Flash, as seen in Desmond's vision at the start of the episode. As also foreseen, Charlie activates the trap that is supposed to kill him. Desmond, however, pushes him to the ground, saving his life and narrowly avoiding the arrow. Charlie immediately understands that Desmond knew it would happen.

As they continue onwards, Jin and Desmond are unable to decide which direction to go. Hurley suggests that he and Charlie go one way while Jin and Desmond go another. Charlie immediately declines and wants to go with Desmond. When they are alone, Charlie yells at Desmond for not telling him the truth about his visions, to which he responds that "it would be pointless for Desmond to save him, as it will keep happening over again", referring it to a 'test of God'. Jin suddenly calls for them, as he and Hurley have discovered the beacon and the parachutist hanging motionless from the trees. Desmond climbs the tree and cuts off the parachute, so Jin, Charlie and Hurley can use it as a safety net for when Desmond cuts the pilot free. Convinced that he will be finally reunited with Penny, Desmond quickly removes the helmet, only to discover that she is a different woman (Naomi). As the episode concludes, she mutters Desmond's name.

== Production ==
Marsha Thomason's character was originally credited as "parachutist" in the official press release, before it was revised to give her character the name Naomi.

== Reception ==
The episode received 12.08 million American viewers. IGN's Chris Carabott wrote that "the thought of the normally good-hearted and endearing Desmond leading Charlie to his death is an intriguing premise", but was critical of the love-triangle subplot, calling it a "step back".
