= BlackBerry World =

Defunct sales platform for apps

- Home screen of BlackBerry World on BlackBerry Z10
- Developer: BlackBerry Limited
- Release: 30 July 2010; 16 years ago
- Final release: 5.4.0.8 / May 2020; 6 years ago
- Written in: Java, C++
- Operating system: BlackBerry OS, BlackBerry 10 OS, BlackBerry Tablet OS
- Platform: BlackBerry
- Size: 260,000+ apps (all OS)
- Available in: 14 languages
- List of languages English, French, Italian, German, Spanish, Brazilian Portuguese, Dutch, Indonesian, Chinese, Japanese, Vietnamese, Thai, Finnish, Korean
- Type: Digital distribution
- License: Proprietary
- Website: BlackBerry World

BlackBerry World was an application distribution service (app marketplace) by BlackBerry Limited. The service provided BlackBerry users with an environment to browse, download, and update mobile apps, including third-party applications.

The service went live on 1 April 2009; 17 years ago, originally named BlackBerry App World. It worked with BlackBerry 10 devices, the BlackBerry PlayBook, and a majority of BlackBerry OS devices. At one point in 2011, BlackBerry World had the largest revenue per app at $9,166.67, compared to its rivals ($6,562.50 by Nokia Ovi Store, $6,480.00 by Apple App Store and $1,200.00 by Google Android Market), although total revenue was lower than Apple App Store.

BlackBerry devices after 2015 (with the release of the BlackBerry Priv) no longer use the BlackBerry 10 operating system, but instead use the Android operating system with the Google Play store for app distribution instead. BlackBerry World servers alongside other BlackBerry services shut down in January 2022.

== History ==
BlackBerry App World main screen depicting a featured app on a legacy BlackBerry OS device (pre-2013)

BlackBerry World home screen on the legacy BlackBerry OS device Curve 9380 (pre-2013)

In 2003, Research In Motion (RIM) (now known as BlackBerry Limited) launched the Mobile Data Service to enable customers to access Java-based third-party enterprise applications using the secure real-time push-based BlackBerry infrastructure.

Later on 21 October 2008, RIM announced at the BlackBerry Developer Conference that the company would open an application store for their devices. It was also announced that the store was scheduled to be open in March 2009, and would work in conjunction with PayPal's services. On 19 January 2009, RIM began accepting submissions of applications from developers.

On 4 March 2009, RIM officially named the store 'BlackBerry App World' (previously called the BlackBerry Application Storefront). It was also confirmed that the service would not initially be available for desktops, and only a web-based catalogue would be accessible from non-BlackBerry devices.

On 1 April 2009, at the Cellular Telecommunications and Internet Association (CTIA) trade show, RIM announced that App World had gone live.

At the BlackBerry-sponsored Wireless Symposium, it was announced that an average of one million apps were being downloaded each day.

On 19 August 2010, BlackBerry App World 2.0 was released. This new version introduced BlackBerry ID; an account system that can be used on both the BlackBerry client, and the BlackBerry App World desktop storefront. In addition to BlackBerry ID, BlackBerry App World 2.0 also introduced direct credit card billing and carrier billing for AT&T Wireless subscribers.

On 3 December 2010, Research in Motion announced that daily downloads were two million apps per day.

On 2 February 2011, BlackBerry App World 2.1 was released. This version introduced in-app purchases of digital goods, allowing for add-ons to be purchased within applications.

On 21 January 2013, BlackBerry announced that it rebranded the BlackBerry App World to simpler BlackBerry World, as part of the release of the BlackBerry 10 operating system.

On 18 June 2014, BlackBerry announced an official relationship with Amazon, which includes access to Amazon Appstore in BlackBerry 10.3.

On 14 December 2017, BlackBerry announced that BlackBerry World would close at the end of 2019, however the store was not closed, and continued to function as of August 2020. On 1 April 2018, BlackBerry removed payment features from BlackBerry World.

The store eventually closed in January 2022 with other BlackBerry 10 and BlackBerry OS services.

=== Milestones ===
At the beginning of 2011, 16,000 apps were available on BlackBerry App World. A year later, the app store passed 60,000 apps (January 2012), and a month later 70,000 apps (February 2012). At BlackBerry Jam in September 2012, RIM announced that App World had more than 105,000 apps.

In May 2013, at the Blackberry Live Conference, BlackBerry announced that over 120,000 apps for BlackBerry 10 were available to download from BlackBerry World.

Application verification was done for BlackBerry World apps about content and quality before is agreed to launch. About 85 percent of the verification was done in Denpasar, Bali, Indonesia.

table of apps on BlackBerry App World
date	downloads per day	downloads to date	available apps
30 Jul 2010	1,000,000		10,438
27 Sep 2010	1,500,000		
14 Feb 2011	2,000,000		26,179
22 Mar 2011	3,000,000		
12 Jul 2011	3,000,000	1,000,000,000	36,781
7 Feb 2012	6,000,000	2,000,000,000	67,310
8 Jul 2012	6,000,000+	3,000,000,000	77,501
31 Mar 2013	6,000,000+	4,000,000,000	135,000
23 Apr 2014			234,500

== Pricing and availability ==
Research In Motion (RIM) announced that the store would initially be available in the United Kingdom, Canada, and the United States. As of March 2013, BlackBerry World was available in 170 markets, and supported 23 currencies and 33 languages. Over 6 million applications were downloaded daily, with an aggregate of over 4 billion downloads to-date.

As of August 2020, BlackBerry World was available in 171 countries and territories.

Applications were both free and paid; from $0.99, to $599.99 USD in the U.S.

The store was available for the following BlackBerry devices that are updated to BlackBerry OS version 4.5.0 or higher:

- BlackBerry Leap
- BlackBerry Porsche Design P'9983
- BlackBerry Classic
- BlackBerry Passport
- BlackBerry Porsche Design P'9982
- BlackBerry Q5
- BlackBerry Q10
- BlackBerry Z3
- BlackBerry Z10
- BlackBerry Z30
- BlackBerry Bold 9900/9000/9700/9780/9650/9790
- BlackBerry 9720
- BlackBerry PlayBook
- BlackBerry Porsche Design P'9981 9981
- BlackBerry Torch 9800/9810 - Preloaded
- BlackBerry Style 9670 - Preloaded
- BlackBerry Storm and BlackBerry Storm2 9500/9520/9530/9550
- BlackBerry Tour 9630
- BlackBerry Pearl 3G 9100/9105
- BlackBerry Pearl 8100/8110/8120/8130
- BlackBerry Pearl Flip 8220/8230
- BlackBerry Curve 3G 9300/9330
- BlackBerry Curve 8900
- BlackBerry Curve 8520/8530/9320
- BlackBerry Curve 8300 8300/8310/8320/8330
- BlackBerry 8800
- BlackBerry PlayBook

== Storage ==
Users were initially allowed to archive their apps on a MicroSD, or on eMMC storage of certain BlackBerry smartphone models. The archive to external memory card function was later removed with the release of App World 3.0.

== Developer ==
In 2010, Research In Motion (RIM) announced several new tools to make it easier for BlackBerry applications developers to build, simulate, deploy, and monetise feature-rich applications on the BlackBerry platform; including the BlackBerry Enterprise Application Development Platform, the next generation BlackBerry Web Application Platform, BlackBerry WebWorks Platform for the BlackBerry PlayBook™ Tablet and BlackBerry smartphones, and BlackBerry Payment Service, BlackBerry Push Service, BlackBerry Advertising Service, Location Service, Maps Services, Analytics Service, Scoreloop, BBM Social Platform Software Developer Kits, et al.

BlackBerry embraced open standards, and included a variety of open source libraries out of the box including: Lua, OpenAL, cocos2d-x, and Box2D, and has an open source repository that can be accessed at GitHub.com/blackberry. This open ecosystem helps developers target multiple platforms through partnerships with Appcelerator, Apache Cordova, dojo, jQuery Mobile, Marmalade, NME, Qt, and Sencha Touch.

BlackBerry has changed its whole direction of development tools, mainly embracing their C++ / Cascades as the 'native' road to develop mobile apps for their BlackBerry 10 platform. HTML5 is considered the almost-native second path for development. In April 2014, BlackBerry has announced to stop the support of Adobe Air with the release of BlackBerry 10.3.1 to be released later 2014. From the time of the release of BlackBerry 10.3.1, it will not be possible to upload new Adobe Air-based apps to BlackBerry World.

== See also ==
- List of mobile app distribution platforms
