= BlackBerry Unified Endpoint Manager =

Enterprise software

BlackBerry Unified Endpoint Manager (UEM), formerly BlackBerry Enterprise Server (BES), designates the middleware software package that is part of the BlackBerry wireless platform supplied by BlackBerry Limited. The software plus service connects to messaging and collaboration software (MDaemon Messaging Server, Microsoft Exchange, Lotus Domino, Novell GroupWise) on enterprise networks to redirect emails and synchronize contacts and calendaring information between servers, desktop workstations, as well as mobile devices. Some third-party connectors exist, including Scalix, Zarafa, Zimbra, and the Google Apps BES Connector, although these are not supported by BlackBerry Limited.

== BES Versions ==
- 2.2: BES for Domino
- 3.6: BES for Exchange
- 4.0: BES for Exchange, Domino, and GroupWise
- 4.1: BES for Exchange, Domino, and GroupWise
- 5.0: BES for Exchange, Domino, and GroupWise
- BES 10
- BES 10.1
- BES 10.2
- BES 12
- BES 12.1
- BES 12.2
- BES 12.3
- BES 12.4
- BES 12.5
- UEM 12.6
- UEM 12.7
- UEM 12.8
- UEM 12.9
- UEM 12.10
- UEM 12.11

Before version 4.0, BES was largely two separate codebases, with the 2.2 version for Domino and the 3.6 version for Exchange. In version 4.0 and beyond, much of the code is integrated, but separate distributions remain for each supported mail platform. Beginning with version 4.1.2, the company introduced a newer option, BlackBerry Enterprise Server for Applications, which provides a secure wireless gateway for BlackBerry devices without requiring the device owner to possess an email account. The latest major revision, version 5.0, was released in 2009 for Exchange and Domino; support for GroupWise was added in 2010.

To support the growing number of multiple devices, ownership models, and operating environments, BlackBerry updated the Enterprise Mobility Management (EMM) by bringing together Mobile Device Management, Security, Unified Communications and Applications by launching BlackBerry Enterprise Service 10 (BES 10).

== BES 5 and Below ==
=== Components ===
BES 5 and below consists of a set of Windows services that carry out the basic operations of the system. These Windows Services can include (additional services may be installed depending on configuration):

- BlackBerry Alert
- BlackBerry Attachment Service
  - Retrieves and converts attachments to a format specific to the BlackBerry device
    - For documents with file extensions .doc, .xls, .ppt, .pdf, .wpd, and .txt, the Attachment Service renders the content into the Universal Content Stream format for viewing on the device.
- BlackBerry Collaboration Service
  - Provides IM services
- BlackBerry Controller
  - The BlackBerry Controller monitors the BlackBerry Dispatcher, BlackBerry MDS Connection Service, and the Enterprise Management Web Service and restarts them if they stop responding.
- BlackBerry Database Consistency Service
- BlackBerry Dispatcher
  - The BlackBerry Dispatcher maintains an SRP connection with the BlackBerry Infrastructure over the Internet. The BlackBerry Dispatcher is responsible for compressing and encrypting and for decrypting and decompressing data that travels over the Internet to and from the devices.
- BlackBerry Instant Messaging Connector
- BlackBerry Messaging Agent
  - Performs wireless calendar synchronization
  - Generates initial encryption key
  - Provides email and lookup services
- BlackBerry MDS Connection Service
  - Services push requests from intranet applications
- BlackBerry MDS Services - Apache Tomcat Service
  - Sends and receives internet/intranet web browsing to the device through BlackBerry Dispatcher service
  - Used for data flow with 3rd party Java applications on device
- BlackBerry Policy Service
  - Pushes wireless IT policies to devices
  - Performs new Encryption Key Generation
  - Sets command for device locks and remote wipe
- BlackBerry Router
  - The BlackBerry Router is an optional component that can be deployed in a DMZ if required. The BlackBerry Router connects to the BlackBerry Infrastructure, which sends data to BlackBerry devices over mobile networks or the Internet.
  - Link between BES (can be installed on the same server) and SRP host
- BlackBerry Synchronization Service
  - Performs OTA backup and synchronization of all PIM data (contacts, tasks, and notes) except the calendar.
- BlackBerry User Administration Service (Only 3.6 and BlackBerry Resource Kit (BRK) in 4.0 and 4.1)

=== Log Files ===
BES also produces a set of log files during an operation called the BES Event Log. The log files include (for a BES v4.0 and 4.1 system connecting to Microsoft Exchange):

- ALRT - BES Alert
- BBIM - BlackBerry Instant Messenger (4.1)
- BBUA - BlackBerry User Administration Service (BRK)
- CBCK - Backup Connector
- CEXC - MS Exchange PIM Connector
- CNTS - Lotus Notes/Domino Connector
- CMNG - Management Connector
- CTRL - BlackBerry Controller
- DISP - BlackBerry Dispatcher
- MAGT - BlackBerry Mailbox Agent (aka BlackBerry Messaging Agent)
- MAST - Mail Store Service
- MDAT - Mobile Data Services
- MDSS - MDS Services (4.1)
- MDSS-DISCOVERY - MDS Services (4.1)
- POLC - Policy Service
- ROUT - Router
- SYNC - BlackBerry SyncServer
- PhoneCallLog (4.1)
- PINLog (4.1)
- SMSLog (4.1)

=== Managing BES 5 ===
BES is typically deployed and managed within the enterprise by messaging administrators (for example, the individuals already responsible for managing Microsoft Exchange, Lotus Domino, or Novell GroupWise) or sometimes a dedicated IT person, usually called the BlackBerry or BES Administrator.

=== BPS and BES Express ===
As of 2010, RIM is offering free the Blackberry Enterprise Server Express edition with no user limitations. It has a few minor feature limitations but only requires a data plan - not a BES plan. It enables near-instant seamless mail and calendar integration with your existing exchange server (incoming emails often appear on the Blackberry handset before they appear in the Outlook or OWA clients), which is an advantage over the existing Outlook Web Access model that the Blackberry Internet Service offers.The free download requires a license code, which may be delayed due to demand.

As of January 2007, RIM is offering a free version of BES called BlackBerry Professional Software, a free download from the BlackBerry website and includes 1 user license. BPSE provides a "...wireless communications and collaboration solution designed specifically for small and medium-sized businesses." It comes with one CAL (Client Access License) - meaning one BlackBerry handheld can be activated on the Server, and you can add up to 29 additional CALs (for a total of 30) or upgrade to BlackBerry Enterprise Server at any time. It is only available for Notes and Exchange environments. BPS is based on the 4.1 code, but with a more simplified management tool, a limited number of patches are being released. (BPS is "stuck" at v 4.1.4, where full BES is at 4.1.6 plus maintenance Releases). As such, BPS is missing out on some functions that full BES did get from SP6 onwards, such as rich content email, free/busy search, and remote search.

Blackberry Professional Software - originally called Blackberry Enterprise Server Express - first appeared with version 4. There was BES (full), and BES Express (same as full, but no cost, limited maximum number of clients, and 1 CAL included free); they then renamed BES Express to BPS, but it was still the same thing, and then later they introduced BES Express 5, which is rather different from the previous BES Express and BPS primarily because it allows non-BES devices/subscribers to have a "full-fat" Blackberry experience which is finally cost/feature competitive with Exchange ActiveSync devices, i.e., provides full synchronisation of read/unread status, deletions, mail subfolders (including sent items), contacts, and calendar, all without license costs and the requirement of an expensive and sometimes extremely difficult to acquire BES tariff. (For example, Orange in the UK may make it challenging to supply BES package/provisioning to less than 10 handsets at a time, and other operators often have extreme difficulty applying the BES package to handsets/subscribers that were originally BIS supplied.)

For GroupWise RIM offered Blackberry Enterprise Server. As of 2011 version 5.0 is available.

=== BlackBerry Enterprise Server Resource Kit ===
The BlackBerry Enterprise Server Resource Kit (BRK) is a collection of useful tools and other resources released to expand the manageability of the BlackBerry Enterprise Server. These tools are available as a free download. Each BRK release is developed and certified as compatible for each BES service pack.

The BRK includes tools such as:

- BlackBerry User Administration Service (BESUserAdmin) — Allows administrators to perform user and smartphone administration on the command line level.
- NoResponseCheck Tool — Analyzes the logs for threads reporting as non-responsive to differentiate between non-responsive and slow threads.
- MessageFlow Tool — Tracks the flow of mail from the mail server through the BlackBerry Enterprise Server to the BlackBerry smartphone and provides statistics in a csv file
- AvailIndex Tool — Analyzes log files and produces a snapshot report of user activity for a specific time in a CSV file.
- HistoricalStats Tool — Checks usage patterns of individual users and provides statistics on a per-day per-user basis.
- OutOf Coverage Tool — Checks for users who have not sent/received it in a specified time.
- Pending Tool — Tracks messages pending delivery in BlackBerry Enterprise Server.
- Delayed Notifics administrators to detect when BlackBerry Enterprise Server is no longer receiving notifications for new emails in a timely fashion.
- MapiCdoErrors Tool — Allows administrators to scan the logs for common MAPI/CDO errors and custom events they wish to choose.
- MDSPush vs Pull Tool — Enables Administrators to monitor whether the BlackBerry Mobile Data Service is processing more data by push or by pull.
- BlackBerry SysLog Service — Provides Administrators with real-time monitoring of BlackBerry Enterprise Server log events.
- BlackBerry Domain Administration History Tool — Audits configuration changes to the BlackBerry Enterprise Server environment and outputs to a csv file.
- log monitor Tool — Monitors a text file for one or more events and allows Administrators to specify actions they want the tool to perform after it finds a value that meets the set criteria.
- Message Receipt Confirmation Tool — Provides Administrators with real-time verification that the Blacsages to BlackBerry devices.
- Enterprise Activation Status Tool — Provides the ability to monitor the changing activation status of a BlackBerry smartphone and troubleshoot activation issues.
- Upgrade IT Policy Template Tool — Allows administrators to upgrade the IT policy template for the BlackBerry Configuration Database with new BlackBerry smartphone policy rules without upgrading the BlackBerry Enterprise Server software.

There are also special support tools available to those who contact the support group.

== BES 10 ==
=== Key Features ===
- Management of most types of devices.
  - Allows users to support BlackBerry 10, iOS, Android, and BlackBerry OS devices.
- Single, unified interface.
  - It has a single web interface to view all types of devices to perform tasks such as creating and managing groups, managing device controls and activating mobile devices.
- Secured Experience
  - Provides control, security, and management to all devices connected to your network, whether owned by the organization or by the users.
- Balance of Work and Personal needs
  - Allows separation of Personal and work information separation through BlackBerry Balance and Secure Workspace.

=== Components ===
BES 10 helps enterprises to manage different devices in a unified interface. Below are the components to deliver this experience:

- BlackBerry Device Service
  - Provides administration for BlackBerry 10 Devices (Q10, Z Series (Z30, Z10, Z3), Leap, Passport, Classic) and PlayBook Tablets.
- Universal Device Service
  - Provides administration to iOS and Android devices.
- BlackBerry Management Studio
  - Provides a unified interface to administer common tasks for BlackBerry 10 Smartphones, BlackBerry 7.0 and earlier smartphones, BlackBerry PlayBook tablets, iOS devices, and Android devices.
- BlackBerry Enterprise Server 5 (BES 5.0.4)
  - Provides administration to old BlackBerry OS smartphones (i.e. BlackBerry Bold Series, BlackBerry Curve Series). This separate software can be connected to BlackBerry Management Studio to deliver a unified console.
