= BlackBerry Porsche Design P'9983 =

Smartphone by BlackBerry

- Manufacturer: BlackBerry
- Type: Smartphone
- Availability by region: October 2014
- Predecessor: BlackBerry Porsche Design P'9982
- Related: BlackBerry Q10; P'9981; P'9982
- Compatible networks: LTE; HSPA+ EDGE; GSM
- Form factor: Bar
- Dimensions: 119 mm (4.7 in) H 67.1 mm (2.64 in) W 10.6 mm (0.42 in)
- Weight: 140 g (4.94 oz)
- Operating system: BlackBerry 10.3
- CPU: ARM 1.5 GHz dual-core Qualcomm Snapdragon S4 Plus (MSM8960)
- Memory: 2 GB RAM
- Storage: 64 GB flash memory
- Removable storage: Up to the exFAT file system limit
- Battery: 2100 mAh removable battery
- Rear camera: 8 megapixels, 1080p video capture
- Front camera: 2 megapixels, 720p video capture
- Display: 720 × 720 px (0.52 megapixels), 3.1-inch display at ~328 ppi, 1:1 aspect ratio
- Connectivity: Wi-Fi 802.11 a/b/g/n, Bluetooth 4.0, NFC, Micro HDMI, Micro-USB
- Data inputs: Multi-touch touchscreen, physical QWERTY keyboard

The BlackBerry Porsche Design P'9983 is a high-end smartphone by BlackBerry and Porsche Design. Announced in September 2014 and released the following month, the device combines BlackBerry 10.3 software with a compact square touchscreen and hardware QWERTY keyboard aimed at the luxury segment.

Like the BlackBerry Q10, on which it is based, the P'9983 features a 3.1 inch 720×720 display, 1.5 GHz dual-core Qualcomm Snapdragon S4 processor, 2 GB of RAM and 64 GB of internal storage, expandable via microSD card. The handset ships with BlackBerry 10.3 preinstalled, including features such as BlackBerry Hub, BlackBerry Assistant and built-in access to the Amazon Appstore for Android applications.

Porsche Design reworked the exterior of the phone with a stainless steel frame and a QWERTY keyboard with "glass-like" keys made from composite plastic. Pre-release specifications described a back cover with "Glass Weave" technology. The 8-megapixel rear camera has a sapphire-crystal-coated lens, and the phone was listed on the Porsche Design Group's website at €1,650, far above the price of the Q10, positioning it as a luxury device.

Owners of the P'9983 were assigned a BlackBerry PIN from an exclusive Porsche Design PIN ID group, identifying them as Porsche Design users on BBM. In March 2015 BlackBerry introduced a "Graphite" variant, described as having "exclusive graphite-metallic colored elements and the finest, hand-wrapped leather on the back door cover".

== Pricing and reception ==
At launch the P'9983 was listed on the Porsche Design Group's website at €1,650. Engadget gave a price of £1,400 (about US$2,000) and reported that it would go on sale at Harrods in London at the start of October 2014, with other high-end retailers following about a week later. Reviewers noted that the hardware was essentially that of the Q10: Engadget called it "merely a dressed-up version of the old Q10", and T3 described it as "just a nicer-looking BlackBerry Q10 with premium branding and a massive price bump".

== See also ==
- BlackBerry 10
- List of BlackBerry 10 devices
- BlackBerry Porsche Design P'9981
- BlackBerry Porsche Design P'9982
- BlackBerry Q10
