= BlackBerry Porsche Design P'9982 =

Smartphone by BlackBerry

- Manufacturer: BlackBerry
- Type: Smartphone
- Availability by region: December 2013
- Successor: BlackBerry Porsche Design P'9983
- Related: BlackBerry Z10 P'9981
- Compatible networks: LTE PCS; CDMA; HSPA+ EDGE GSM
- Form factor: Slate
- Dimensions: 131 mm (5.2 in) H 65.6 mm (2.58 in) W 9.5 mm (0.37 in)
- Weight: 140 g (4.94 oz)
- Operating system: Blackberry 10.2.1; Released January 28, 2014
- CPU: ARM 1.5 GHz dual-core Qualcomm Snapdragon S4 Plus (MSM8960) (STL100-2 & STL100-3 & STL100-4); Texas Instruments OMAP 4470 (STL-100-1)
- Memory: 2 GB RAM
- Storage: 64 GB flash memory
- Removable storage: Up to the exFAT file system limit
- Battery: 1800 mAH removable battery
- Rear camera: 8 megapixels, 1080p video capture
- Front camera: 2 megapixels, 720p video capture
- Display: 1,280 × 768 px (0.98 megapixels) 4.2-inch (built on 71 µm pixel) at 356 ppi, 15:9 aspect ratio
- Connectivity: IEEE 802.11n-2009, Bluetooth 4.0, NFC, Micro HDMI, Micro-USB
- Data inputs: Multi-touch touchscreen, on-screen keyboard
- Website: ca.blackberry.com/smartphones/blackberry-p9982.html

The BlackBerry Porsche Design P'9982 is a high-end smartphone by BlackBerry and Porsche Design. Released in December 2013, it is based upon the BlackBerry Z10, having exactly the same internal hardware specifications except for an increase of internal memory from 16 GB to 64 GB and a microSD slot that is now verified for 64 GB cards.

Porsche Design has modified the phone design by adding stainless steel and satin materials to the body to create a more "premium" device, which is slightly larger and has more heft than the BlackBerry Z10. The P'9982 runs Blackberry 10.2.1 and features a slightly modified user interface by Porsche Design that features a new alarm clock, lock screen display, square-shaped icons and custom BBM PINs.

== See also ==
- BlackBerry 10
- List of BlackBerry 10 devices
