= BlackBerry Q5 =

BlackBerry smartphone

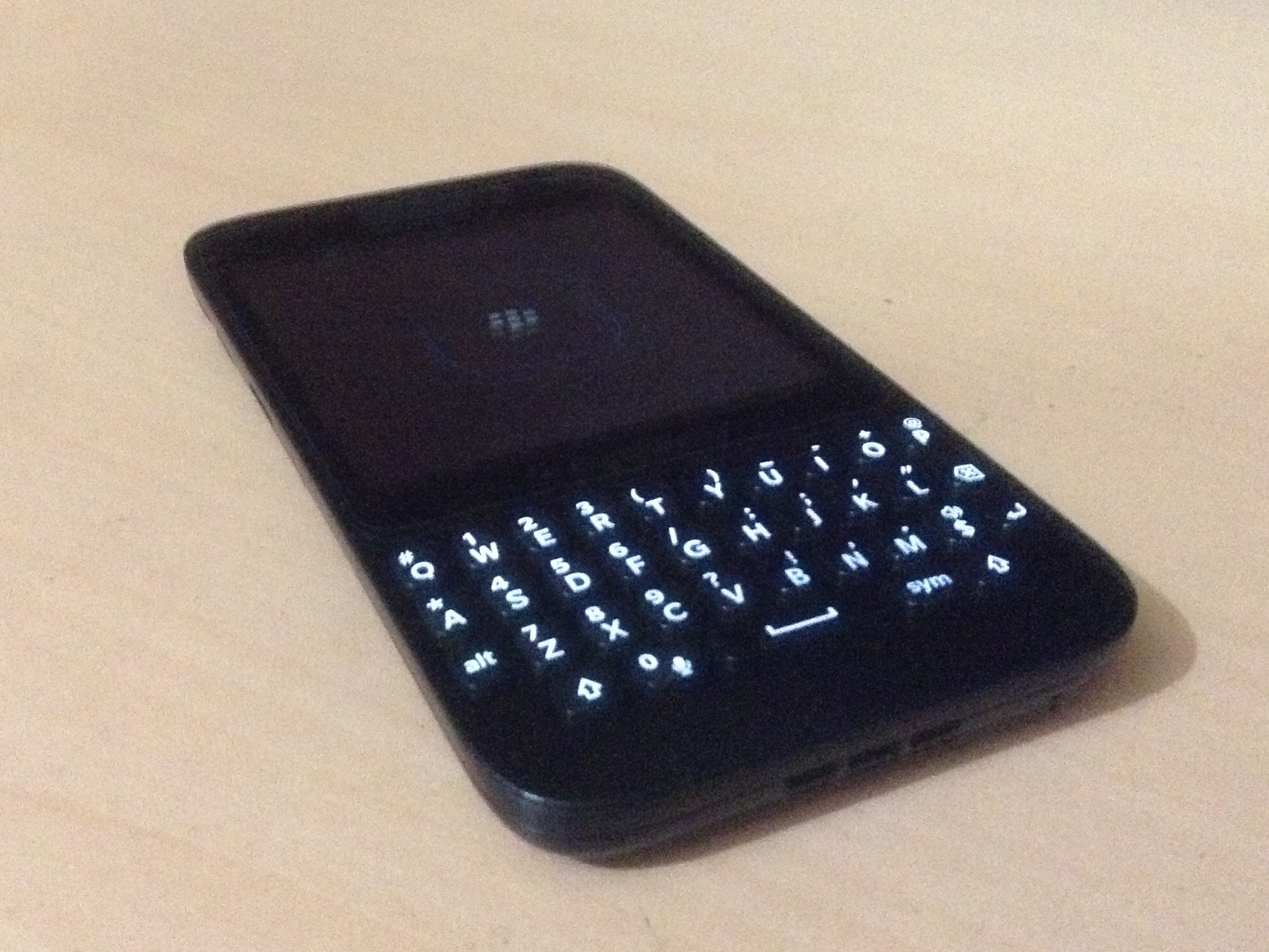
- BlackBerry Q5 booting up
- Manufacturer: BlackBerry, Ltd.
- Availability by region: 2013
- Predecessor: BlackBerry Curve series
- Successor: BlackBerry Z3; BlackBerry Key2 LE
- Related: BlackBerry Q10
- Compatible networks: GSM, UMTS (including HSPA+), LTE
- Form factor: Candy bar smartphone
- Dimensions: 120 mm (4.7 in) H 66 mm (2.6 in) W 10.8 mm (0.43 in) D
- Weight: 120 g (4.23 oz)
- Operating system: BlackBerry 10
- CPU: 1.5 GHz dual-core Snapdragon S4 Plus (MSM8960)
- GPU: Adreno 225
- Memory: 2 GB RAM
- Storage: 8 GB internal storage
- Removable storage: exFAT file system limit
- Battery: 2180 mAh Li-Ion non-removable battery
- Rear camera: 5 megapixels, 1080p video capture
- Front camera: 2 megapixels, 720p video capture
- Display: 720x720 px (0.52 megapixels) 3.1-inch (built on 77μm pixel)
- Connectivity: List: Wi-Fi: 802.11 b/g/n 2.4 GHz; Wi-Fi hotspot; DLNA; GPS NFC; Bluetooth 4.0; Micro-USB 2.0
- Data inputs: Multi-touch touchscreen, QWERTY keyboard
- Other: Accelerometer, Ambient light sensor, Gyroscope, Magnetometer, Proximity sensor

The BlackBerry Q5 is a mid-range touchscreen-based QWERTY smartphone developed by BlackBerry, previously known as RIM (Research In Motion). It is the third BlackBerry 10 smartphone, unveiled at the BlackBerry Live 2013 Keynote on May 14, 2013.

Replacing the BlackBerry Curve line, the Q5 serves as the budget counterpart of the more upmarket BlackBerry Q10/Z10 and is mainly targeted largely at emerging markets because of its lower end specifications. Like the previous entry-level BlackBerry devices, it is also available in multiple color options; black, white, red, pink and grey.

== Features ==
Compared to the Q10, Q5's keyboard has more space between the individual buttons, reminiscent of the previous BlackBerry Curve lineup which it replaced. The display is an IPS LCD as opposed to AMOLED on the Q10, while the camera resolution is 5 megapixels (8 megapixels on the Q10).

Exclusive features include BlackBerry Hub, which allows users to view email, messages, and social network updates with a swipe to the side while using any application.

== Availability ==
The BlackBerry Q5 was first available in the United Arab Emirates and later in India and Canada. The target regions for this product are Europe, the Middle East, Africa, Asia and Latin America. India is the first country in Asia Pacific where this product was launched. In 2014, BlackBerry had a large portion of the smartphone market in India.

== Model comparison ==
Model	SQR100-1	SQR100-2	SQR100-3
Countries	Canada, Saudi Arabia	Austria, Egypt, France, Germany, Italy, Malaysia, Netherlands, Singapore, South Africa, Spain, Thailand, Turkey, United Arab Emirates, United Kingdom	India, Indonesia
Carriers/Providers	Axiom, Bell, Fido, Koodo, Mobily, MTS, PC mobile, Public Mobile, Rogers, SaskTel, STC, Telus, Vidéotron, Virgin Mobile (Canada), Wind Mobile, Zain (Saudi Arabia)	A1 Telekom Austria, Avea, Bouygues, Celcom, Deutsche Telekom, du, EE, Etisalat, KPN, M1, Maxis, MTN (South Africa), O2 Germany, Orange (France), Orange (UK), SingTel, SFR, StarHub, Talkmobile, Telkom (South Africa), TIM, T-Mobile (Netherlands), T-Mobile UK, Tune Talk, Turkcell, Virgin Media, Virgin Mobile France, Vodacom, Vodafone Egypt, Vodafone Germany, Vodafone Italy, Vodafone Spain, Vodafone Turkey, Yoigo	Indosat, Telkomsel, Vodafone India, XL Axiata
2G	Quad-band GSM/GPRS/EDGE (850/900/1800/1900 MHz)		
3G	Quad-band HSPA+ 1, 2, 4, 5/6 (800/850/1700/1900/2100 MHz)	Quad-band HSPA+ 1, 2, 5/6, 8 (800/850/900/1900/2100 MHz)	Quad-band HSPA+ 1, 2, 5/6, 8 (800/850/900/1900/2100 MHz)
4G	Quad-band LTE 2, 4, 5, 17 (700/850/1700/1900 MHz)	Quad-band LTE 3, 7, 8, 20 (800/900/1800/2600 MHz)	
NFC	Yes	Yes	No

== See also ==
- BlackBerry 10
- List of BlackBerry 10 devices
