= List of BlackBerry 10 devices =

This is a list of all devices running the discontinued BlackBerry 10 operating system. The company's later devices, starting in the fall of 2015 with the BlackBerry Priv, use the Android operating system instead.

== Smartphones ==
=== Mid-range ===
Mid-range devices are targeted at emerging markets and budget-conscious customers. They use dual-core processors. Between 8 GB and 16 GB of internal storage is included, though more can be added with a separate microSD card.

Product	Release date	Processor	RAM	Storage		Display		Camera(s)		Physical keyboard
Product	Release date	Processor	RAM	Internal	Removable	Size	Resolution	Back	Front	Physical keyboard
BlackBerry Q5	June 2013	1.2 GHz	2 GB	8 GB	up to 32 GB	3.1"	720x720	5 MP	2 MP	Yes
BlackBerry Z3	October 2013	1.2 GHz	1.5 GB	8 GB	up to 128 GB	5"	540x960	5 MP	1.1 MP	No
BlackBerry Leap	April 2015	1.2 GHz	2 GB	16 GB	up to 128 GB	5"	720x1280	8 MP	2MP	No

=== Flagship ===
Flagship devices are featured the most in BlackBerry advertisements. The Passport features a quad-core processor. All other devices use dual-core processors.

Product	Release Date	Processor	RAM	Storage		Display		Camera(s)		Physical Keyboard
Product	Release Date	Processor	RAM	Internal	Removable	Size	Resolution	Back	Front	Physical Keyboard
BlackBerry Classic	December 2014	1.5 GHz	2 GB	16 GB	up to 128 GB	3.5"	720x720	8 MP	2 MP	Yes
BlackBerry Passport	September 2014	2.2 GHz	3 GB	32 GB	up to 128 GB	4.5"	1440x1440	13 MP	2 MP	Yes
BlackBerry Q10	April 2013	1.5 GHz	2 GB	16 GB	up to 64 GB	3.1"	720x720	8 MP	2 MP	Yes
BlackBerry Z10	January 2013	1.5 GHz	2 GB	16 GB	up to 64 GB	4.2"	768x1280	8 MP	2 MP	No
BlackBerry Z30	September 2013	1.7 GHz	2 GB	16 GB	up to 64 GB	5"	720x1280	8 MP	2 MP	No

=== Porsche Design ===
Porsche Design smartphones are luxury offerings that are designed by Porsche Design, the luxury product design subsidiary of the automobile brand Porsche. These devices use luxury components on the exterior. The internal hardware is the same as the corresponding flagship devices, but the internal storage is upgraded to 64 GB.

Product	Release Date	Processor	RAM	Storage		Display		Camera(s)		Physical Keyboard
Product	Release Date	Processor	RAM	Internal	Removable	Size	Resolution	Back	Front	Physical Keyboard
BlackBerry P'9982	January 2014	1.5 GHz	2 GB	64 GB	up to 64 GB	4.2"	768x1280	8 MP	2 MP	No
BlackBerry P'9983	January 2014	1.5 GHz	2 GB	64 GB	up to 128 GB	3.1"	720x720	8 MP	2 MP	Yes
