= BlackBerry Leap =

Smartphone by BlackBerry Limited

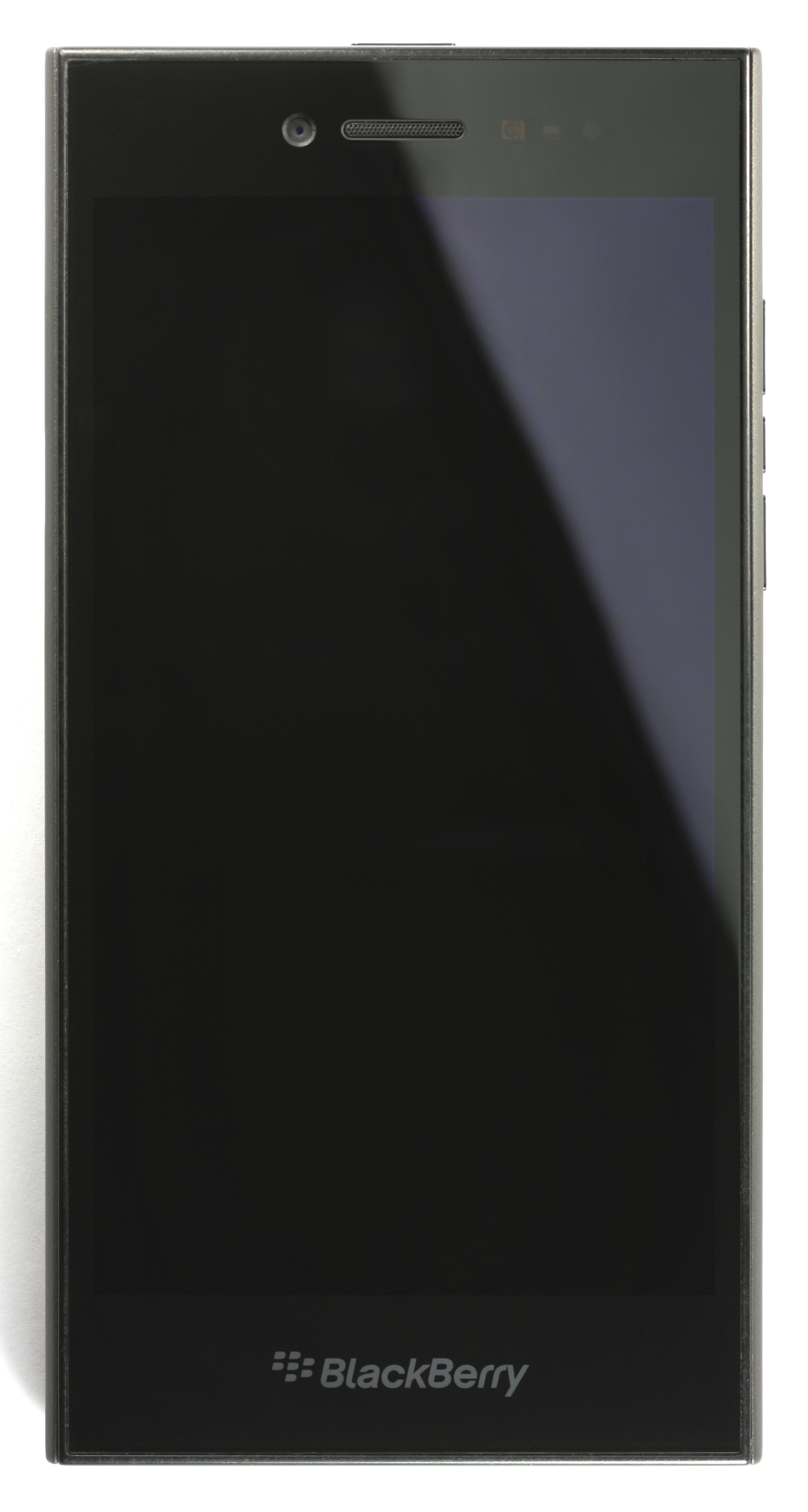
- Manufacturer: BlackBerry Limited
- Type: Smartphone
- Predecessor: BlackBerry Z3
- Successor: BlackBerry Motion; BlackBerry Evolve
- Related: BlackBerry Z3 BlackBerry Z10 BlackBerry Z30
- Compatible networks: LTE PCS; HSPA+ EDGE GSM
- Form factor: Slate
- Dimensions: 144 mm (5.7 in) H 72.8 mm (2.87 in) W 9.5 mm (0.37 in) D
- Weight: 170 g (6.00 oz)
- Operating system: BlackBerry 10.3.1
- System-on-chip: Qualcomm Snapdragon S4 Plus
- CPU: Krait, 1.5 GHz dual-core
- GPU: Adreno 225
- Memory: 2 GB RAM
- Storage: 16 GB internal storage
- Removable storage: microSD, up to 128 GB
- Battery: 2800 mAH non removable battery
- Rear camera: 8 megapixels, 1080p video capture, autofocus, Digital Image Stabilization
- Front camera: 2 megapixels, 720p video capture
- Display: 5.0 in (130 mm) IPS LCD; 1280x720 pixels, 294 PPI
- Connectivity: List: Wi-Fi: 802.11 b/g/n 2.4 GHz; Wi-Fi hotspot; GPS; Bluetooth 4.0; Micro-USB 2.0
- Data inputs: Multi-touch touchscreen
- Other: Accelerometer, Proximity sensor, Ambient light sensor
- Website: Official website

The BlackBerry Leap was a mid-range smartphone developed by BlackBerry Limited. Announced on March 3, 2015, at the Mobile World Congress with initial availability in April 2015, the Leap was a follow-on to the affordable Z3 model with a number of upgraded features. Upgrades included LTE support, higher-resolution display and cameras, higher-performance CPU and GPU, double the internal storage capacity, and an updated version of the BlackBerry 10 operating system. Size and weight increased very slightly from the Z3 model. The BlackBerry Leap was the final BlackBerry 10 device, as the BlackBerry Priv, the next BlackBerry flagship device, adopted Android.

== Specifications ==
=== Hardware ===
The BlackBerry Leap has a 5.0-inch IPS LCD, dual-core 1.5 GHz Krait Qualcomm Snapdragon S4 Plus processor, 2 GB of RAM and 16 GB of internal storage that can be expanded using microSD cards up to 256 GB. The phone has a 2800 mAh Li-ion battery, 8 MP rear camera with LED flash and 2 MP front-facing camera with auto-focus. It is available in black or white colors. It features connectivity to WiFi, Bluetooth and GPS. It measures 144 mm x 72.8 mm x 9.5 mm and weighs 170 grams.

=== Software and Features ===
The BlackBerry Leap runs on BlackBerry 10 operating system, version 10.3.1. This OS features the BlackBerry Hub, a unified inbox for all communications including emails, text messages, and social media notifications. The device also includes BlackBerry Balance, which separates work and personal data, allowing users to switch between profiles.

Key software features of the Leap include:

1. BlackBerry Assistant: A voice-activated digital assistant for hands-free device control.
2. BlackBerry Blend: Allows users to access messages and content from their BlackBerry on a computer or tablet.
3. BlackBerry World: An app store for downloading applications and games.
4. BlackBerry Browser: Supports HTML5 and provides a fast browsing experience.
5. BlackBerry Maps: Offers turn-by-turn navigation and 3D maps.

The device also comes preloaded with productivity apps such as Documents To Go for viewing and editing Microsoft Office files.

== Design ==
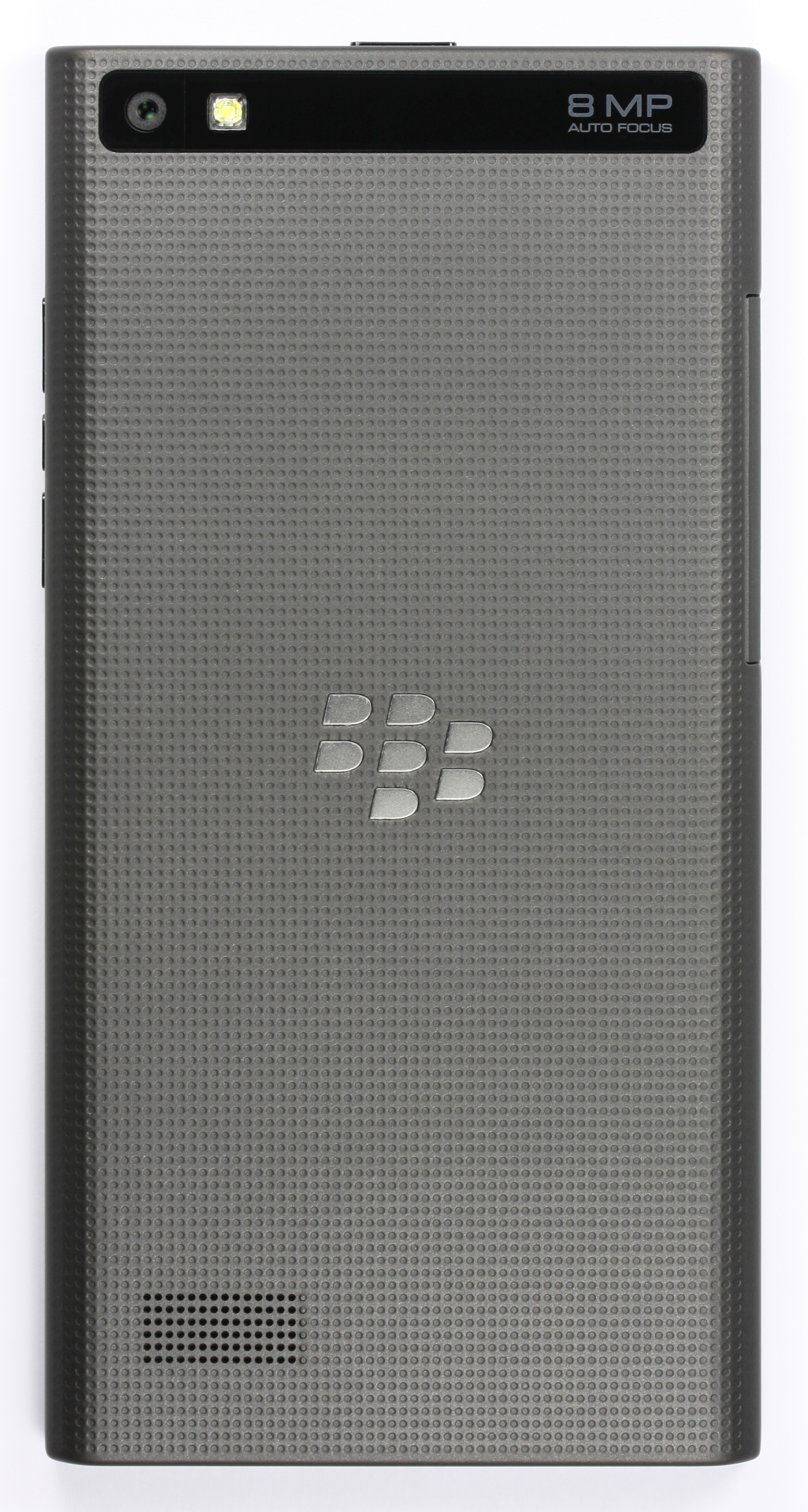
The back of the BlackBerry Leap

According to BlackBerry product designers, key design criteria for the Leap include solid single-body construction, edge-to-edge glass, straightforward SIM/SD card exchange and ease of repairability. Special attention is paid to aesthetic details such as the texture and grip of the covering, laser-cut speaker ports, and the overall look of the white-colored model.

== End of support ==
BlackBerry ended development of BlackBerry 10.3.x in August 2018 and designated the operating system end-of-life in December 2019. The company then decommissioned its legacy BlackBerry 10 services on 4 January 2022. BlackBerry listed the Leap among the affected devices and warned that data, phone calls, SMS and emergency-calling functions would no longer operate reliably after the shutdown.

== Sales ==
BlackBerry announced the global rollout of the Leap on April 15, 2015, with immediate availability via various resellers in the UK market. By April 22, 2015, customers in the French, German and US markets were able to order the Leap via either Amazon.com, BlackBerry Ltd.'s "Shop BlackBerry" website, or certain local resellers. Releases for other markets including Canada, India, United Arab Emirates and Saudi Arabia have since been made as well.

== Reception ==
Various journalists and industry pundits handled the device and gave preliminary assessments at its initial showing at the 2015 Mobile World Congress. It received reviews praising the sleek design as well as the display, although it was criticized for "not standing out."

== Gallery ==
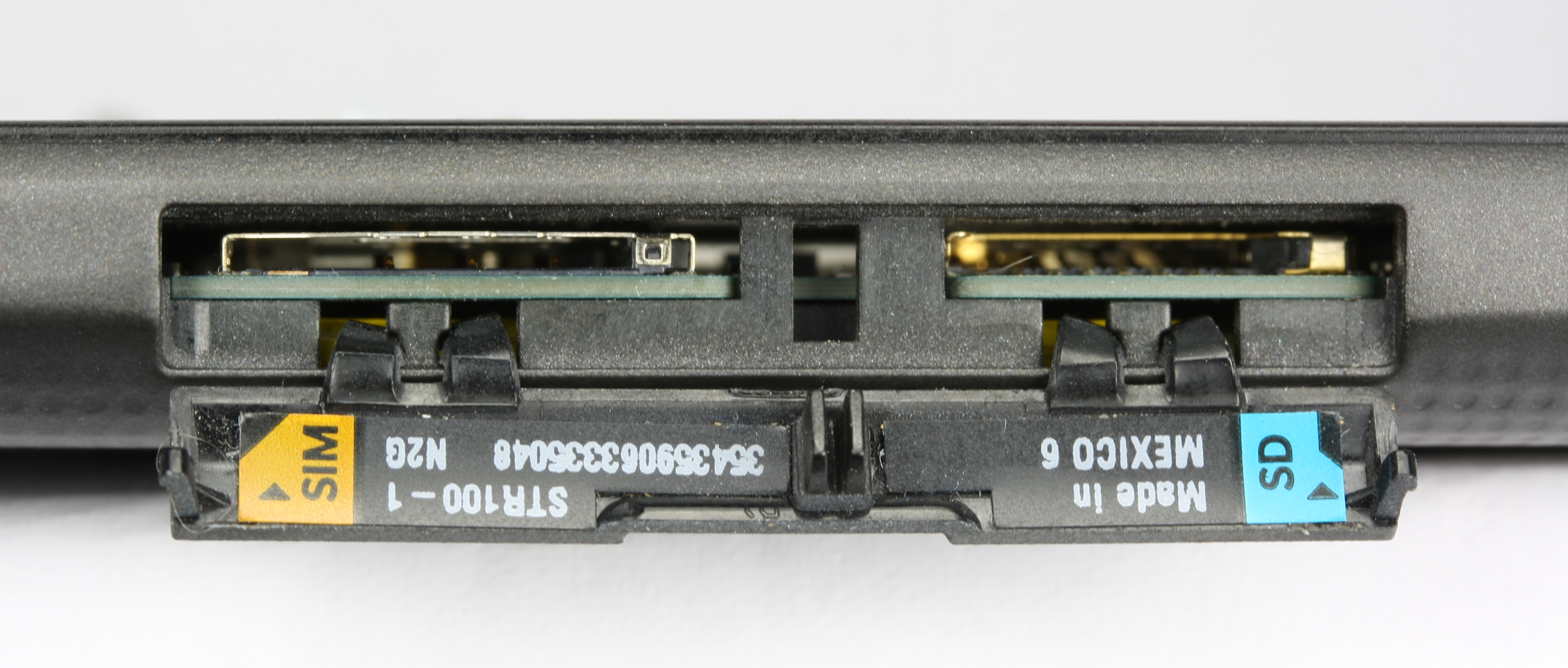
The SIM card and memory card slots

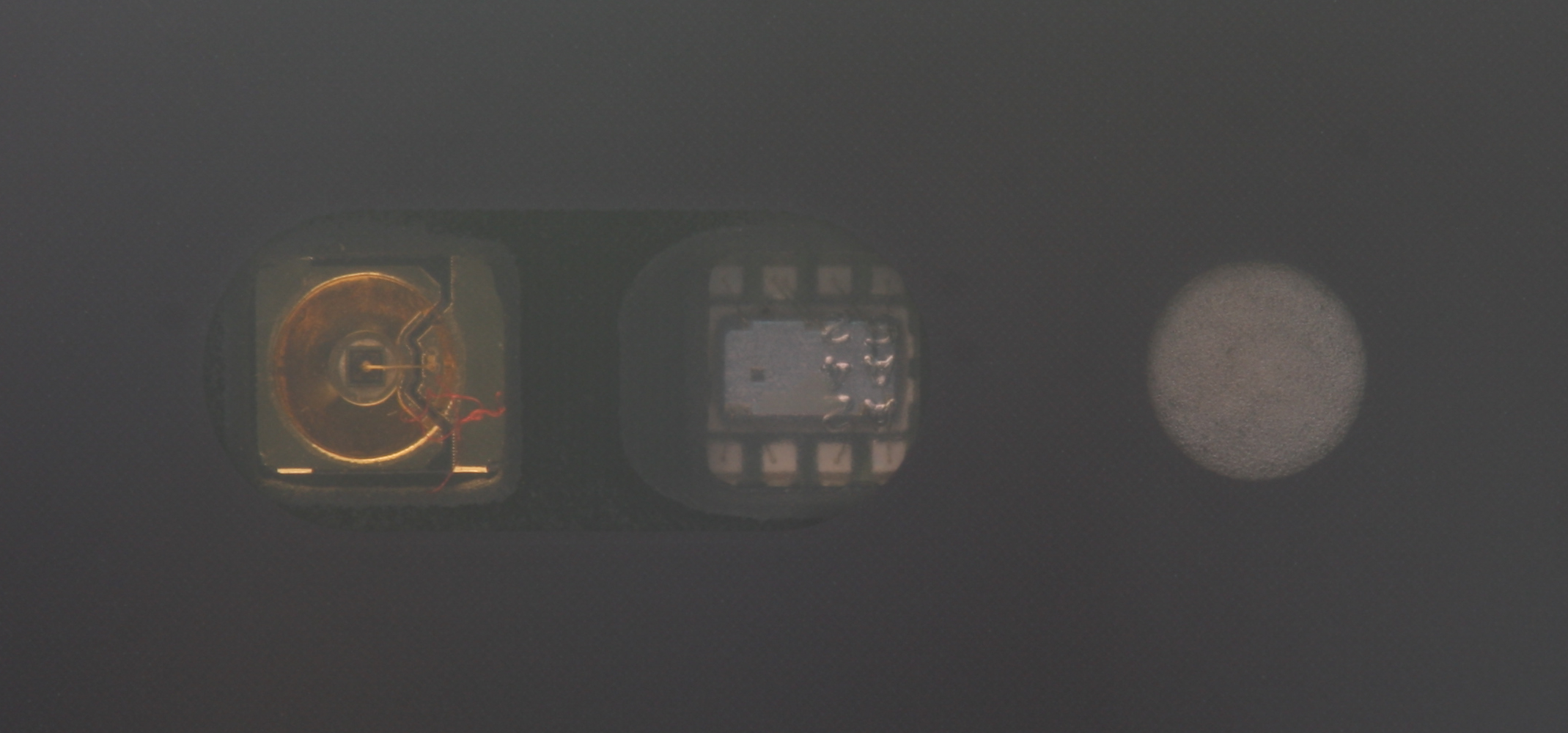
The array of sensors on the front at the top

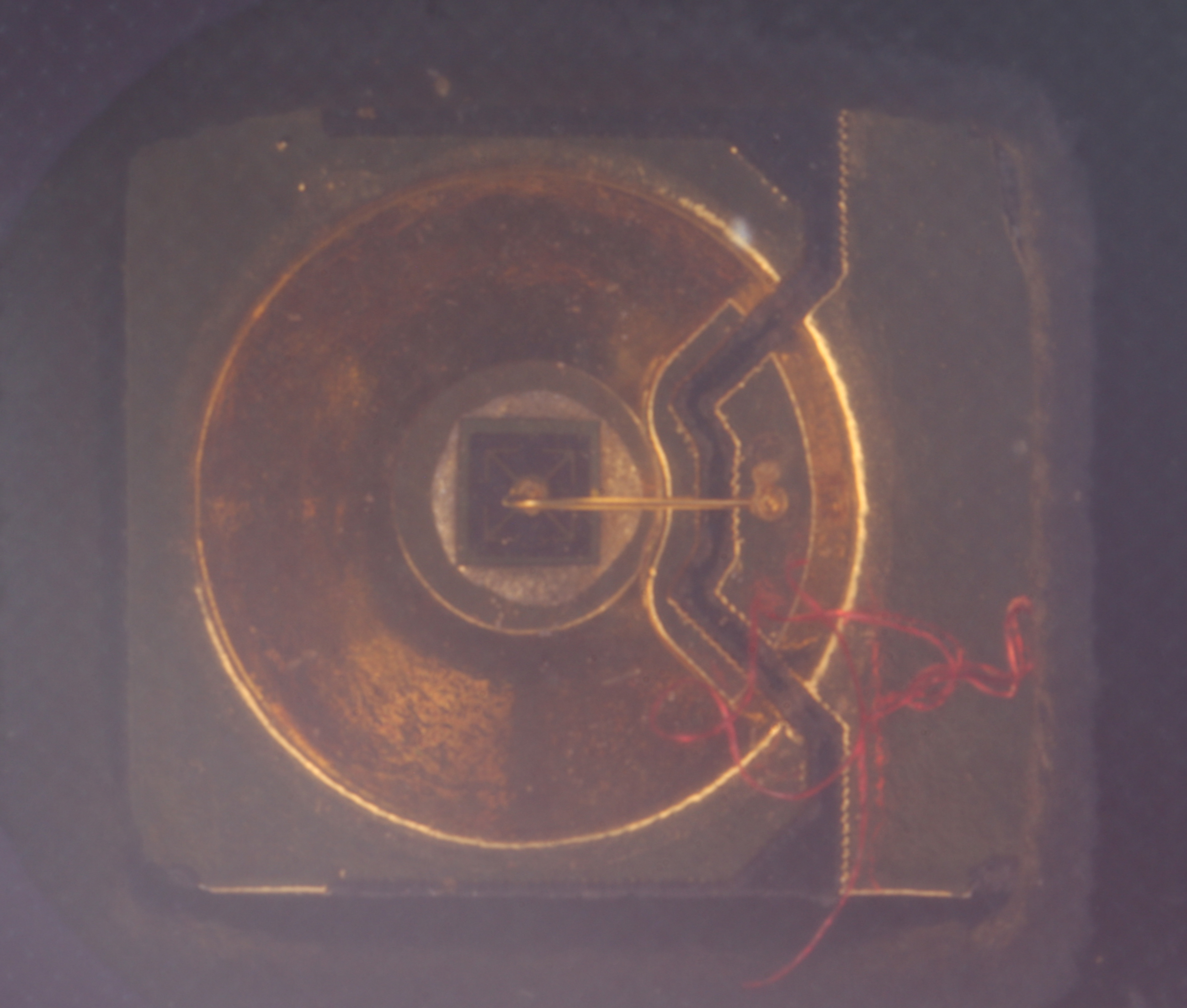
The sensor in the array at the top which is used to check if the phone is covered by the ear therefore turning the screen off

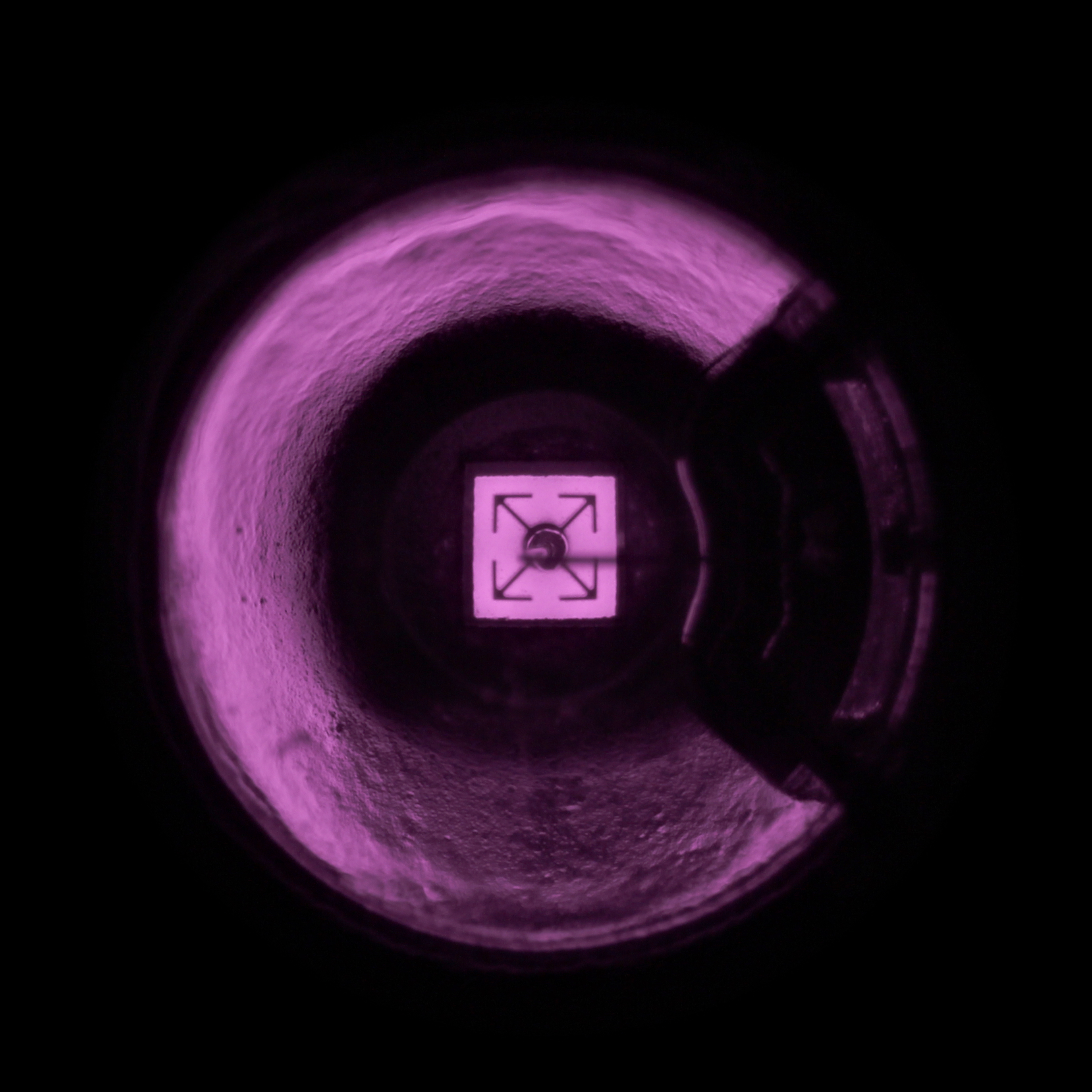
The flashing proximity sensor

Video of the flashing proximity sensor

== See also ==
- BlackBerry 10
- List of BlackBerry 10 devices
