= BlackBerry 10 =

Proprietary mobile operating system

- BlackBerry Hub on the BlackBerry Z10 model
- Developer: BlackBerry Ltd.
- Written in: C, C++, Qt
- OS family: Unix-like, QNX
- Source model: Closed source
- Initial release: January 30, 2013; 13 years ago
- Final release: 10.3.3.3216 / April 4, 2018; 8 years ago
- Available in: Multilingual
- Update method: Firmware over-the-air, BlackBerry Link (carrier dependent)
- Package manager: .bar (BAR); Android Package sideloading (version 10.2.1 and higher)
- Supported platforms: ARM
- Kernel type: Real-time, microkernel
- Default user interface: Graphical
- License: Proprietary
- Preceded by: BlackBerry OS
- Succeeded by: Android (BlackBerry Secure OS)
- Official website: ca.blackberry.com/software/smartphones/blackberry-10-os.html

Support status
- Unsupported as of January 4, 2022

BlackBerry 10 (BB10) is a deprecated proprietary mobile operating system for the BlackBerry line of smartphones, developed by BlackBerry Limited (formerly known as Research In Motion). Released in January 2013, BlackBerry 10 is a complete rework from the company's previous BlackBerry OS software.

It is based on QNX, a Unix-like operating system that was originally developed by QNX Software Systems until the company was acquired by Research In Motion in 2010. BlackBerry 10 supports the application framework Qt (version 4.8) and in some later models features an Android runtime to run Android applications. Prior to version 10.3.1, BlackBerry 10 also supported the Adobe AIR runtime. The user interface uses a combination of gestures and touch-based interactions for navigation and control, making it possible to control a device without having to press any physical buttons, with the exception of the power button that switches the device on or off. It also supports hardware keyboards, including ones that support touch input.

BlackBerry began to deprecate BlackBerry 10 in 2015, announcing a pivot towards Android devices with the BlackBerry Priv, and gradually discontinuing BB10 devices and software. The OS was officially declared end-of-life on January 4, 2022.

== History ==
The operating system was originally called BBX, but this was changed when BlackBerry was blocked from using the BBX trademark after legal action from BASIS International, who already used it for their software.

On November 12, 2012, CEO Thorsten Heins announced a 30 January 2013, launch of the BlackBerry 10 operating system version 10.0 and the first smartphones running it. The operating system, as well as two devices, the Z10 (a full touchscreen device), and the Q10 (a device equipped with a physical keyboard), were announced simultaneously around the world on January 30, 2013. The company also announced that the BlackBerry PlayBook tablet would receive an update to BlackBerry 10 later in 2013. Subsequently, BlackBerry stated when releasing their Q1 2014 financial results that the BlackBerry PlayBook would not be receiving an update to BlackBerry 10, citing that the hardware would not provide a good experience of BlackBerry 10 and were focusing on future devices. BlackBerry continued to support and develop the PlayBook with its separate Tablet OS.

On 12 May 2013 BlackBerry OS 10.1 was launched. This brought improvements to many features requested by users.

On 13 September 2013, in Asia, BlackBerry announced the launch of BlackBerry OS 10.2 and a new BlackBerry 10 device, the Z30, providing performance increases over the previous BlackBerry 10 devices.

On October 26, 2015, BlackBerry Limited announced that there were no plans to release new APIs and software development kits (SDKs) or adopt Qt version 5. Future updates, like versions 10.3.3 and 10.3.4, would focus on security and privacy enhancements only. At the same time, the company introduced its first Android-based device, BlackBerry Priv. The BlackBerry Leap was the last smartphone released on the BB10 platform. After BlackBerry Limited ceased making smartphones in 2016, its successor BlackBerry Mobile by licensee TCL abandoned the platform and only developed devices based on Android, starting with the BlackBerry KeyOne.

On December 15, 2017, BlackBerry CEO John S. Chen announced that there would be at least another two years of support for BlackBerry 10 and BlackBerry OS devices; in August 2019, however, BlackBerry stated in a press release that they would continue to support "critical infrastructure" for BlackBerry 10 beyond the end of the year. BlackBerry 10 became end-of-life effective January 4, 2022.

== Features ==
=== Controls ===
The touchscreen is the predominant input method of BlackBerry 10, in addition to hardware keyboard for devices that have one. Users can use gestures and keyboard shortcuts to navigate around the system. For instance, a user can unlock the device or return to the home screen by swiping from the bottom to the top. Some gestures offer additional modes of interaction when they are used differently. For instance, the same gesture can be used to show unread notifications when the user swipes from the bottom edge to somewhat the middle and slightly to the right and also keep the finger on the touchscreen. Similarly, when the finger is moved from the bottom to the right in a curved motion, the user can enter BlackBerry Hub immediately. Devices with a hardware keyboard can use keyboard shortcuts to reach applications or perform specific functions more quickly.

=== Multitasking ===
When a user returns to the home screen from within an application, the application is minimized into a so-called "Active Frame". An Active Frame is a miniaturized window of the application that keeps running in the background. A user can return to such an application by tapping on the Active Frame or close it by tapping on the X icon. Active Frames can have widget-like functionality and show small bits of information, similar to widgets on Android. For instance, the calendar application can show upcoming events and meetings. BlackBerry 10 limits the number of active applications and it varies per device.

=== BlackBerry Hub ===
BlackBerry 10 collates emails, SMS/MMS, calls and notifications into the BlackBerry Hub. It shows all messages and notifications in a continuous list, sorted by date. The user can filter results by application or, in the case of email, also by inbox. The user can create, view or act upon messages or notifications directly from the Hub. For instance, when the user opens a Facebook message, the Hub will open a small part of the Facebook application and allow the user to perform the same actions as the Facebook application itself. Applications need to support the Hub specifically to use most of these features, which is only possible for applications written with the native SDK. Notifications from unsupported applications are collated in the generic notifications tab.

=== Miscellaneous ===
Other notable features of BlackBerry 10 include:

- A virtual keyboard with support for predictive typing and several gestures.
- Voice control and BlackBerry Assistant (10.3.1 and later), a virtual assistant, with which the user can perform various tasks by voice input or typed queries.
- BlackBerry Balance, with which the user can separate personal from work data, if enabled by the device's enterprise server. The user can switch between two workspaces, each with their own applications, files and accounts.
- BlackBerry Link, with which the user can synchronize data between the device and a computer, update the device or make backups. It supports iTunes and Windows Media Player.

== Applications ==
=== Preloaded ===
BlackBerry 10 has a number of applications that help users perform various tasks and activities. These include a web browser, as well applications for notes, reminders, calculator, clock, music, media, weather and file management. Cloud services like Box and Dropbox are also integrated by default. In addition, BlackBerry's messaging service BlackBerry Messenger is included, which supports video chat, VoIP and screen sharing.

=== Third-party applications ===
BlackBerry 10 can run applications that were written with its native SDK, Android applications compiled for API levels 10–18 (Android 4.3 "Jelly Bean") (support varies per version) and applications written for Adobe AIR (only supported until version 10.3.1). Apps could be downloaded via the BlackBerry World app store, or sideloaded. Beginning on version 10.2.1, Android apps can be sideloaded directly from APK files (unlike previous versions, where Android apps had to be packaged within BlackBerry 10's native app package format). In June 2014, BlackBerry announced a partnership with Amazon to bundle its Amazon Appstore with the BlackBerry 10.3 update, adding an additional source of Android apps.

At release in January 2013, BlackBerry 10 had 70,000 third-party applications. At the 2013 BlackBerry Live conference, BlackBerry announced that they had more than 120,000 applications.

Some developers have offered applications to access the Google Play Store, although this is not sanctioned by BlackBerry or Google. Applications that depend on the Google Play Services framework may not run. Similarly, Android applications that require a newer API level than 18 cannot run on BlackBerry 10.

== Devices ==
BlackBerry Limited released ten devices running BlackBerry 10, including devices with a slate form factor, and devices similar to the BlackBerry Bold line with smaller screens and physical keyboards (with the BlackBerry Classic going further and also including the trackpad and buttons from the Bold).

Device	Characteristics	Release date	Minimum OS
Z10	4.2" Touchscreen	January 2013	10.0
Q10	3.1" Touchscreen and hardware keyboard	January 2013	10.0
Q5	3.1" Touchscreen and hardware keyboard	May 2013	10.1
Z30	5" Touchscreen	October 2013	10.2
P'9982	4.2" Touchscreen	December 2013	10.2
Z3	5" Touchscreen	February 2014	10.2.1
P'9983	4.5" Touchscreen and hardware keyboard	September 2014	10.3.0
Passport	4.5" Touchscreen and hardware keyboard	October 2014	10.3.0
Classic (Q20)	3.5" Touchscreen, hardware keyboard and dedicated buttons	December 2014	10.3.1
Leap	5" Touchscreen	April 2015	10.3.1

=== Canceled devices ===
- BlackBerry Colt, originally planned as the first QNX-powered BlackBerry smartphone
- BlackBerry Café, a 4.5" all-touch model intended for emerging markets, possibly a successor to the BlackBerry Z3.
- BlackBerry Kopi, a 3.1" QWERTY model intended for emerging markets. "Kopi" is Indonesian for coffee, implying that the device may be primarily targeted for the Indonesian market.

== Developer activities ==
=== Engagement strategy ===
Building up to the launch, the company made substantial changes to how it had previously engaged developers, being substantially more active at courting developers, solving issues and being transparent about development updates. The company sent two teams to engage developers. The first, focused on acquiring premier applications from third parties. The second team focused on engaging the broader development community and building the platforms application count.

=== Prototype smartphones ===
In May 2012, the company released a prototype touch screen smartphone to BlackBerry developers as part of the BlackBerry 10 Jam Conference in Orlando, Florida. The Dev Alpha A device, which resembled a small BlackBerry PlayBook, ran an early version of the operating system and was provided as a means for developers to develop and test their applications on a physical device.

In September 2012, a second developer prototype was released in September 2012, known as the Dev Alpha B. It included a faster processor and a number of internal improvements.

A third developer device, the Dev Alpha C, was announced on November 29, 2012, and was the first developer prototype to demonstrate the physical keyboard capabilities of BlackBerry 10. Acquisition of a Dev Alpha C device was based around a point system, meaning that developers who had previously developed apps for BlackBerry, or who already received the Dev Alpha A/B devices, had a higher chance of receiving a Dev Alpha C device than a new BlackBerry developer. It was released at the BlackBerry Jam Europe 2013 event in February 2013.

=== Portathons ===
Pre-launch "Portathons" held by BlackBerry received up to 19,000 applications submitted per weekend.

== Reception ==
Reviews of BlackBerry 10 were mixed. David Pogue of The New York Times noted that the software was, "simple to master, elegantly designed and surprisingly complete. It offers features nobody else offers, some tailored to the corporate world that raised BlackBerry aloft in its glory days." Walt Mossberg of The Wall Street Journal referred to the operating system as "logical and generally easy to use." Mossberg praised the virtual keyboard, camera software, and messaging hub; but criticized its application ecosystem, cloud capabilities and the immaturity of some features. Gizmodo's Kyle Wagner states that BlackBerry 10's home screen "gives BB10 the single best implementation of multitasking of any mobile OS right now." Wagner goes on to say that the Hub "works out to function a bit more like a junk drawer." He also reports what he refers to as the "Tragic Flaw": "Unlike every other major OS right now, BlackBerry does not feel fully integrated."

In comparison to that, at launch, CrackBerry.com viewed the new features more positively and took into account the fact that the OS is brand new. It said that the BlackBerry Hub "is a polished solution to efficiently managing the influx of messages we have coming at us...". It goes on to mention minor discrepancies and finally pointing out that many of the problems are getting fixed in future updates (some now released, e.g. battery life improvements, call ringtone disabled in bedside mode). It criticizes the limited customization options compared to BlackBerry OS (Alert tone volumes, alert light colour). Regarding the apps in BlackBerry World "really impressed by the quality of apps BlackBerry World has to offer", it notes that the application ecosystem is not as large as Android and iOS because of its age (brand new) and finishes with "doubtlessly many more will come around once they see the Z10 getting traction in the wild." Its general summary of BlackBerry 10 (with thought for its predecessor) "is that BlackBerry 10 really is the best of the old and the best of the new assembled seamlessly into an elegant, practical, and integrated package."

BlackBerry 10 added a compatibility layer for Android software, which allowed developers to repackage their Android apps for distribution on BlackBerry World. This feature was received poorly as the Android apps "performed abysmally on the phone. Sluggish, ugly, and disconnected from the core OS. In fact, because these apps are being run in a software emulation of Android — Gingerbread no less (that's version 2.3) — they bear little to no relationship to the rest of the operating system". Later versions added the ability for users to manually install Android app packages. Beginning with the BlackBerry Passport, Amazon Appstore was bundled with BlackBerry 10 to provide an additional source of third-party Android software. BlackBerry CEO John S. Chen hoped that Amazon's own smartphone, the Fire Phone, would bolster the adoption of the Amazon store and attract more major developers to it, and in turn, BlackBerry's ecosystem. The Fire Phone was a commercial failure, however, which led to BlackBerry's decision to develop an Android phone of its own, resulting in the BlackBerry Priv.

== Version history ==
Obsolete

=== BlackBerry BBX ===
During the BlackBerry DevCon Americas Conference in San Francisco held from October 18–20, 2011 RIM announced the future platform for devices as "BlackBerry BBX", a development fork of the QNX Neutrino RTOS version 6.5.0 platform. On May 1, 2012 it was announced at BlackBerry World 2012 held in Orlando that it would be instead be called BlackBerry 10.

=== BlackBerry 10.0 ===
Table of versions: BlackBerry OS 10.0 (Released: January 30, 2012)
Version	Release date	Features / Improvements
10.0.9.348	(BlackBerry 10 release version)	See BlackBerry 10 for features.
10.0.10.672	March 1, 2013; 13 years ago	3rd party app performance; Fixes for Gmail calendars; Improved - BlackBerry Hub - Call logs and how conversations are handled; Improved - Camera - In low light conditions; Improved - Browser - How it handles video playback; Improved - Battery life - Over 60 power saving improvements made
Version	Release date	Features / Improvements

=== BlackBerry 10.1 ===
Table of versions: BlackBerry OS 10.1 (Released: May 14, 2013)
Version	Release date	Features / Improvements
10.1.0.1720	May 14, 2013; 13 years ago	PIN to PIN messaging; Improved attachment support; Custom notifications; HDR Camera; Fine cursor control; Remote file access to computers; Allows password paste into system fields
10.1.0.2006 10.1.0.2014 10.1.0.2019	June 10, 2013; 13 years ago / June 18, 2013; 13 years ago / July 9, 2013; 13 years ago	Fix for random software reboots
10.1.0.4181	July 29, 2013; 13 years ago	IMAP and ActiveSync email now have "Forever" as a sync option; New gesture in Hub to navigate between messages; Escalate a text to a call; Simple password; Facebook, Twitter, LinkedIn updates
Version	Release date	Features / Improvements

=== BlackBerry 10.2 ===
Table of versions: BlackBerry OS 10.2 (Released: September 18, 2013)
Version	Release date	Features / Improvements
10.2.0.1791	Has been released on the BlackBerry Z30, Z10, Q10, Q5.	Headless Apps.; USB Host Capability.; WiFi Direct and Miracast (Q10/Z30).; Flurry Analytics.; Smart cards.; Altimeter.; Geofencing.; Bluetooth 4.0 low energy interface for cars, heart rate monitors, etc.; Camera enhancements e.g. focus lock and faster picture sharing.; Smart Tag triggers, enhanced list of triggers.; Lock screen notifications, for all types of notification.; Browser enhancements; improved reader mode and faster access to history.; Will also run apps from Android (4.2.2) Jelly Bean.; Multiple Alarms are settable in the clock app.; Priority Hub, learns to summarise that messages are important to you.; Instant Preview & Reply, works whatever app you are in. (Toast notifications).; Free Task Manager/Device monitor app.; Easy "I will be late" meeting notifier.; Custom Easy SMS/BBM reply for ignored phone calls.; Support for web iCal calendars.; Improved text selection, word processing & editing in and between apps.; Keyboard sounds improved to differentiate "Shift", "Symbols" & "Backspace".; Free Evernote app.; Adaptive sharing feature, for quicker sharing of anything.; Enhanced audio experience, and audio codecs.; Android HW acceleration.; Attachment View, for finding things easily without opening mailboxes.; Dark/light theme toggle.
10.2.1.1925 10.2.1.2102 10.2.1.2179 10.2.1.2156 10.2.1.2674	Has been released on the BlackBerry Z30, Z10, Q10, Q5, Porsche Design P'9982	Customize Pinch Gesture to Filter BlackBerry Hub; Simplified Phone Experience; SMS and Email Groups; Actionable Lock Screen Notifications; Picture Password for Quick Unlocking; Customizable Quick Settings Menu; Offline Browser Reading Mode; Preferred Contact Sync; Torch Added; Device and Battery Monitor; FM Radio (not available for Z10); Automatic Software Updates; Enterprise Features; Additionally, the Android runtime has been improved: Native code app and drivers support; Bluetooth API; embedded MapView v1 API; Share Framework; Spellcheck; Wi-Fi Scanning; Able to install Android packages (*.APK files) directly
10.2.1.2941 10.2.1.2977 10.2.1.3289	Has been released on the BlackBerry Z30, Z10, Q10, Q5, Porsche Design P'9982	Unlimited number of apps now allowed to run in background.; Enhancements to Bluetooth stack.; 128GB exFAT-formatted removable microSDXC memory card support; Added IMS Services option in network settings menu for LTE Networks
10.2.2.1531 10.2.2.1609	Has been released regionally on the BlackBerry Z30, Z10, Q10, Q5, Porsche Design P'9982	Security enhancements for some Enterprise customers with specific requirements
Version	Release date	Features / Improvements

=== BlackBerry 10.3 ===
Table of versions: BlackBerry OS 10.3 (Released: October 10, 2014)
Version	Release date	Features / Improvements
10.3.0.1052 /10.3.0.1154 /10.3.0.1418	Has been preinstalled on the BlackBerry Passport and Porsche Design P'9983/Has been released on the BlackBerry Passport	Flat Design UI; Permanent Homescreen (detachable); Android 4.3 runtime with multicore support (Android apps are limited to two cores even on quad-core devices like the Blackberry Passport); Advanced Interactions; Support for BlackBerry Blend; BlackBerry Assistant; Amazon Appstore preloaded
10.3.1.1154 /10.3.1.2072 /10.3.1.2243 /10.3.1.2558 /10.3.1.2576 /10.3.1.2708	Has been preinstalled on the BlackBerry Classic/Has been released on the BlackBerry Classic/Has been released on most existing BlackBerry 10 Smartphones	Customizable notification profiles; Integrated LED color manager; Battery Saving Mode; Option to hide pictures and videos; Customizable keyboard shortcuts; Android runtime screen scaling; 10.3.1.2576 fixes the screen flickering problem that appeared on the Blackberry Passport
10.3.2.680 /10.3.2.858 /10.3.2.2339 /10.3.2.2639 /10.3.2.2876	Has been released on various BlackBerry 10 smartphones by various carriers in Northern America/Has been released on most existing BlackBerry 10 smartphones by various carriers in the rest of the world	Anti-theft protection in BlackBerry Protect; Camera enhancements; Calendar enhancements; Amazon Store app preinstalled; PGP and S/MIME no longer require BES; 10.3.2.2876 removes BBM Meetings
10.3.3.2049	Released on November 30, 2016 as an OS update.	Security improvements; Bug fixes with Android Runtime; Phishing protection in the browser; NIAP security certification, certifying government grade security.; "Download complete" notifications are now pushed by the browser in the status bar and Hub.
10.3.3.3204/ 10.3.3.3216	Released to Verizon and Bell devices on June 1, 2018, possibly on all Blackberry 10 devices and on all carriers, Ukraine got it in May 2018	Bug fixes, Stability and Performance improvements, Blackberry 10 OS Security patches. Security improvements including patches for Security vulnerabilities Spectre and KRACK
Version	Release date	Features / Improvements

== See also ==
- Comparison of mobile operating systems
- Mobile computing
- Index of articles related to BlackBerry OS
- List of BlackBerry 10 devices
