= BlackBerry Z3 =

BlackBerry touchscreen smartphone

- Manufacturer: Foxconn
- Type: Smartphone
- First released: May 13, 2014
- Predecessor: BlackBerry Curve 9380; BlackBerry Q5
- Successor: BlackBerry Leap; BlackBerry Aurora (Indonesia only)
- Related: BlackBerry Z10, BlackBerry Z30
- Compatible networks: HSPA+, EDGE, GSM
- Form factor: Slate
- Dimensions: 140 mm (5.5 in) H 72.8 mm (2.87 in) W 9.3 mm (0.37 in) D
- Weight: 164 g (5.78 oz)
- Operating system: Blackberry 10.3.1
- CPU: ARM 1.2 GHz dual-core Qualcomm Snapdragon 400 (MSM8230)
- GPU: Adreno 305
- Memory: 1.5 GB RAM
- Storage: 8 GB flash memory
- Removable storage: Up to the exFAT file system limit
- Battery: 2500 mAh non removable battery
- Rear camera: 5 megapixels, 2592 х 1944 pixels video capture
- Front camera: 1.2 megapixels,720p 30fps video
- Display: 540 x 960 px, 5-inch (built on 120µm pixel) at 220 ppi
- Connectivity: IEEE 802.11n-2009, Bluetooth 4.0, Miracast, microUSB
- Data inputs: Multi-touch touchscreen, on-screen keyboard

The BlackBerry Z3 is a smartphone developed by BlackBerry. Announced in February 2014, it was the first BlackBerry phone produced in partnership with Foxconn. Adopting a similar appearance and dimensions as BlackBerry Z30, Z3 was designed to be an entry-level version of Z30. It was released on May 13, 2014 in Jakarta. To celebrate the first BlackBerry phone designed for Indonesian market, there was a limited edition called "Jakarta Edition" available. On July 3, 2014 BlackBerry released the Z3 in India. It was then released to Malaysia, Philippines and some African markets.

== Development ==
During the development phase of this phone, it was assigned the codename "Jakarta".

== See also ==
- BlackBerry 10
- List of BlackBerry 10 devices
