= Porsche Design =

German product design studio

Porsche Lifestyle GmbH & Co. KG
- Trade name: Porsche Design
- Formerly: Porsche Lizenz- und Handelsgesellschaft mbH & Co. KG (2003–2022)
- Type: Limited partnership (Kommanditgesellschaft)
- Founded: 1972; 54 years ago in Stuttgart, Germany
- Founder: Ferdinand Alexander Porsche
- Headquarters: Ludwigsburg, Germany
- Parent: Porsche AG
- Website: porsche-design.com

Porsche Design, legally Porsche Lifestyle GmbH & Co. KG, is a German lifestyle brand and product design studio founded in 1972 by Ferdinand Alexander Porsche, the designer of the original Porsche 911, known for its accessories such as sunglasses, pens, and watches.

The current legal instantiation of the company, based in Ludwigsburg, Germany, was formed in November 2003 as a majority-owned subsidiary of Porsche AG to combine Porsche AG's and Porsche Design Group's accessories and licensing business into one single company. The company's activities are focused on the Porsche Design Studio (since 2015 Studio F. A. Porsche) in Zell am See, Austria, which also works for other companies in the field of industrial and product design, and the "Porsche Design" and "Porsche Lifestyle" brands.

== History ==
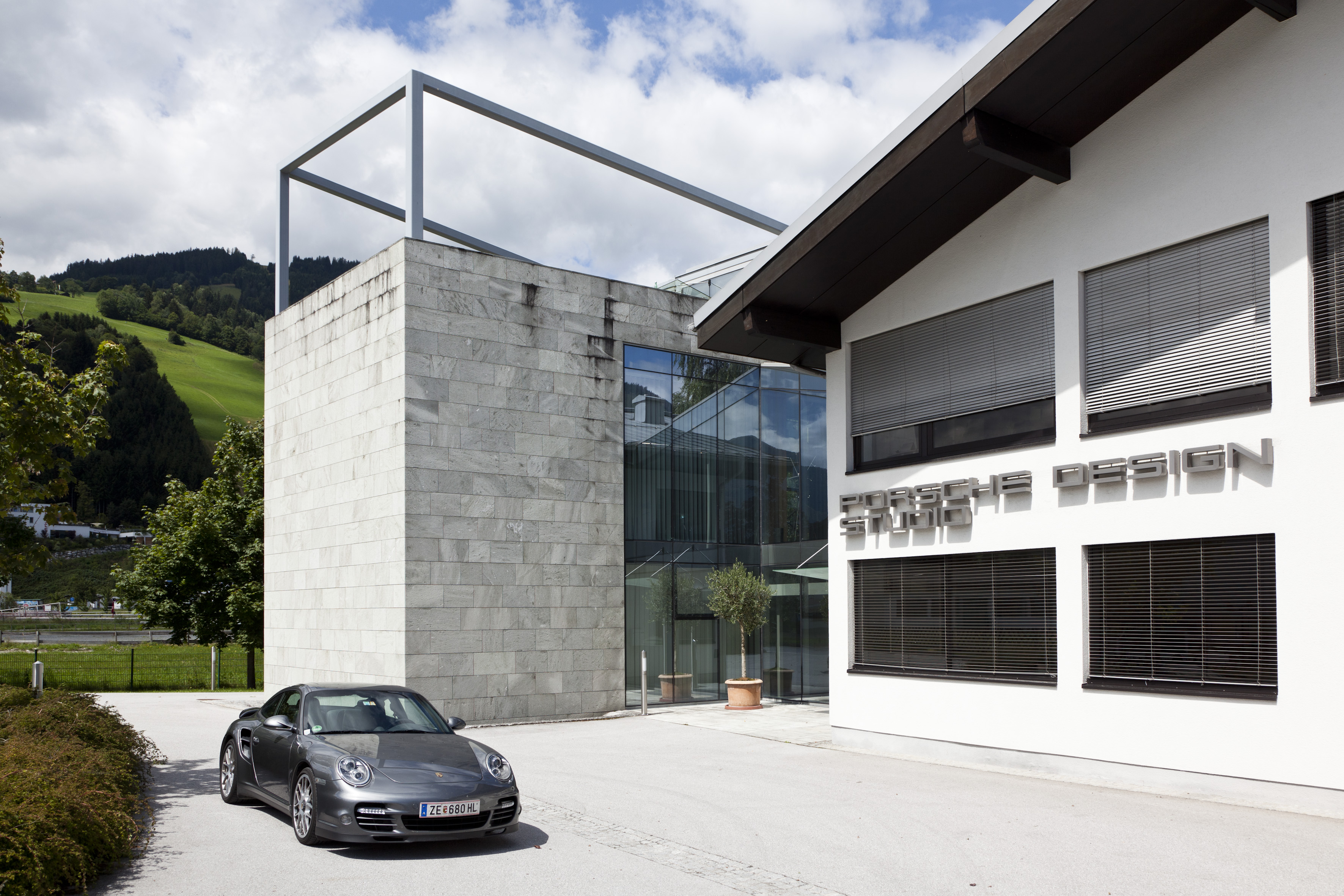
Porsche Design Studio in Zell am See

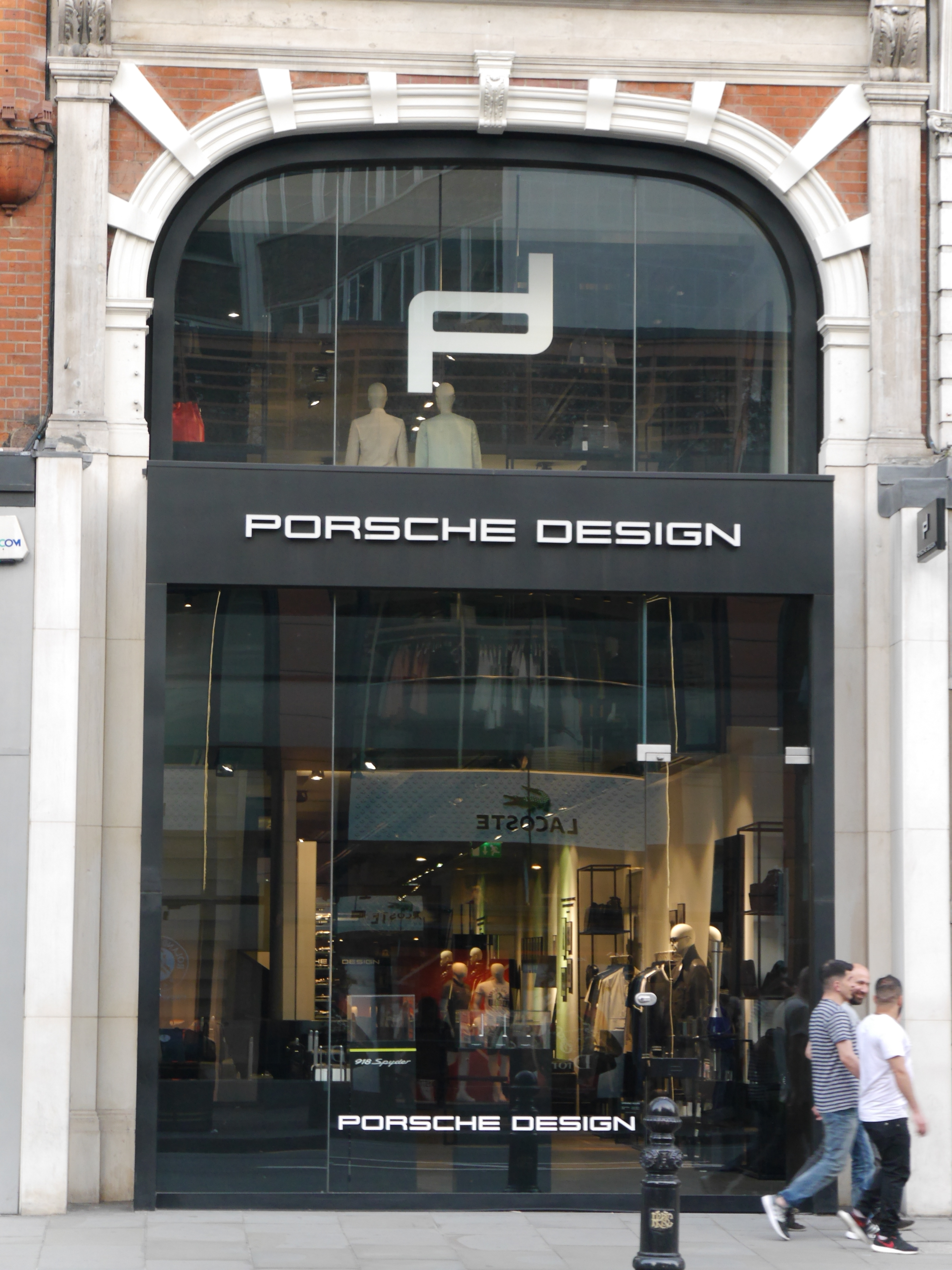
Porsche Design store in London

The Porsche Design Studio was established in Stuttgart, Germany, in 1972 by F. A. Porsche, grandson of Porsche founder Ferdinand Porsche and designer of the Porsche 911. The Porsche 911 (originally 901) is just one example of the many objects F. A. Porsche designed throughout his career.

The P'6510, released in 1972, was the world's first black chronograph.

The Design Studio was relocated to Zell am See, Austria, in 1974. Porsche has been producing car-related accessories since the 1950s, with luggage series, purses, T-shirts, calendars, model cars and buttons being offered in the "Porsche Boutique". In the decades that followed, numerous accessories such as watches, sunglasses, and writing utensils were created and marketed worldwide. At the same time a large number of industrial products, household appliances, and consumer goods—even streetcars for the city of Vienna—were designed under the "Design by F.A. Porsche" brand.

In 1994 the merchandising division of Porsche AG finally acquired the name "Porsche Selection", which was changed to "Porsche Driver's Selection" in 2004. Following a corporate reorganisation in 2007, Porsche Design Group is now owned by Porsche SE, the holding company primarily known as the corporate parent of Volkswagen Group. Originally, there were five independently operated companies with two different brands: "Porsche Design/Design by F.A. Porsche" and "Porsche Selection". In 2015, the Design Studio changed its name to Studio F. A. Porsche in memory of its founder Ferdinand Alexander Porsche.

"Porsche Design Timepieces AG", based in the Swiss Canton "Jura", is responsible for developing and producing Porsche Design timepieces; marketing and sales is overseen by the Porsche Design Group based in Ludwigsburg, Germany. The first watch series offered solely by Porsche Design went on sale in the fourth quarter of 2014, although the first Porsche-designed watch, the "Chronograph 1", was released in 1972.

In 2014, Adidas partnered with Porsche Design to launch the Porsche Design Sport by adidas.

== Products ==
=== Product lines ===
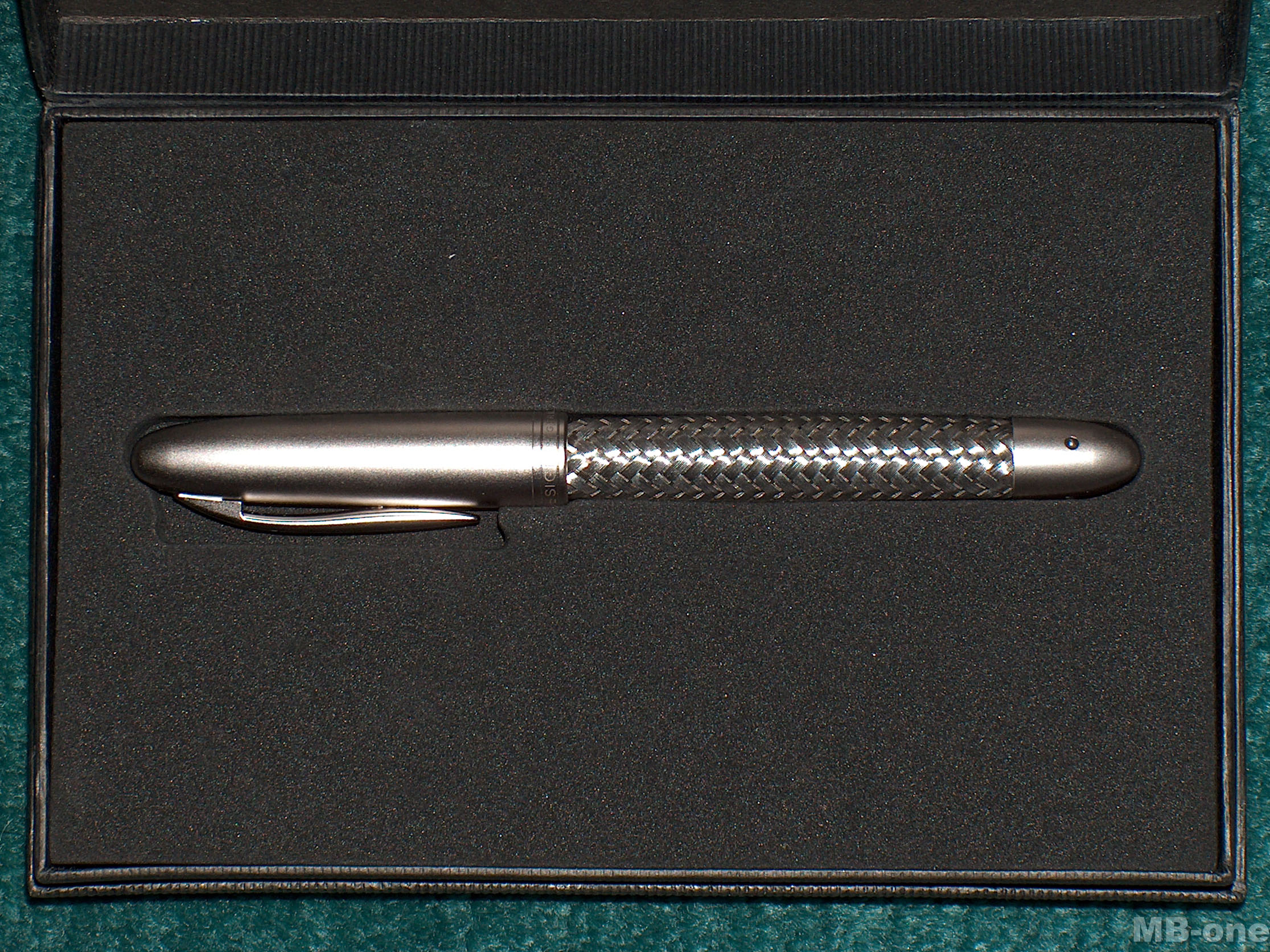
The P'3110 rollerball pen

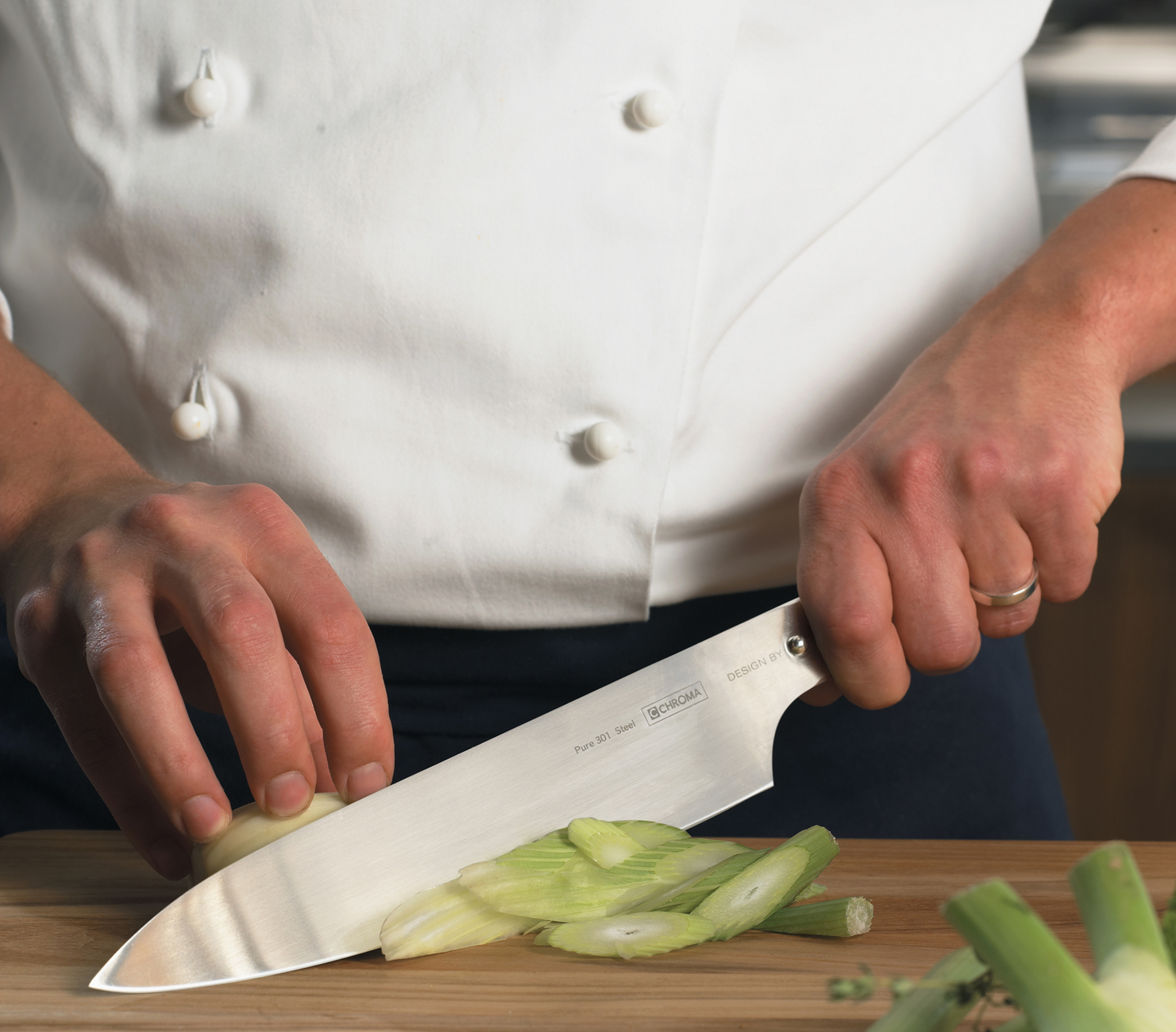
Type 301 stainless steel knife range

Since 2005 all products have been developed and marketed under the brand name Porsche Design. The products are divided into nine different categories:

- P'1000 Fashion
- P'2000 Luggage
- P'3000 Accessories
- P'5000 Sport
- P'6000 Timepieces
- P'7000 Home
- P'8000 Eyewear
- P'9000 Electronics

=== Other products and ventures ===
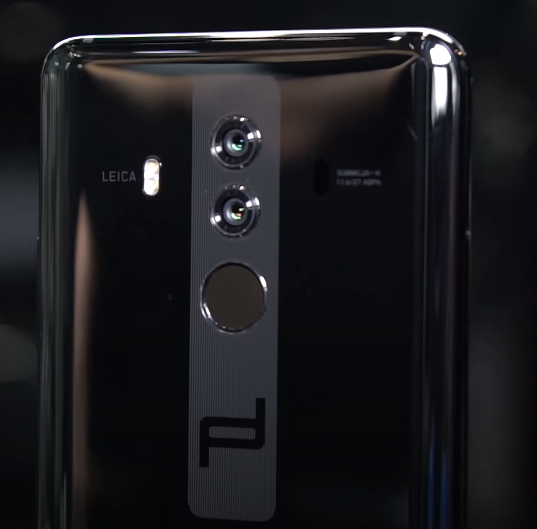
The back of the Huawei Mate 10 Porsche Design

- In 2011 Porsche Design partnered with BlackBerry to create the BlackBerry Porsche Design P'9981 smart phone featuring a stainless steel and leather design. In the Fall of 2014 Porsche Design developed the Porsche Design P'9983 phone based on the BlackBerry Q10.
- In 2016, LaCie, a subsidiary of Seagate Technology, announced their partnership on creating computer hard drives.
- The Porsche Design Huawei Mate series was a collaboration between Porsche Design and Huawei from 2016 to 2022. The series includes the Mate 9, Mate 10, Mate RS, Mate 20 RS, Mate 30 RS, Mate 40 RS, Mate 50 RS, and Watch 2, featuring the Porsche Design logo.
- In February 2017 Porsche Design revealed the Book One, a 13.3-inch 3K QHD+ convertible laptop with Wacom pressure-sensitive pen powered by Windows Ink. The laptop is the result of a collaboration between Microsoft, Intel, and Quanta Computer.
- In 2019, the Ultra One 15.6-inch fanless laptop was released. This laptop featured an Intel 8th Generation processor and a Harman Kardon sound system.
- In 2020, the Porsche Design Book RS was released as part of a joint venture with Acer Inc. This 14-inch laptop was powered by an Intel Evo 11th Generation processor and featured a carbon fiber lid panel. The Premium Collection edition included a slip-sleeve, a leather pouch, a leather mousepad, and a matching Bluetooth mouse with a carbon fiber button.
- In a collaboration with Sieger Suarez Architects, the luxury residences known as the Porsche Design Tower Miami were opened in 2017. The development features three car elevators that lift residents and their cars into so called "Sky Garages". Proposals for additional real estate ventures in Europe were announced, but have not been built.
- Porsche Design Studio worked with Siemens to design the MX3000 electric train for the Oslo Metro since 2007.
