= BlackBerry Porsche Design P'9981 =

Smartphone model

- Manufacturer: Research In Motion
- Availability by region: December 2011
- Successor: BlackBerry Porsche Design P'9982
- Related: BlackBerry Bold 9900
- Compatible networks: Quad band GSM/GPRS/EDGE networks: 850/900/1,800/1,900 MHz; Tri band 3G UMTS networks: 850/1,900/2,100 MHz
- Form factor: Wide-set physical keyboard smartphone
- Dimensions: 115.0 x 67.0 x 11.3 mm (4.53 x 2.64 x 0.44 in)
- Weight: 155.0g (5.68oz)
- Operating system: BlackBerry OS 7.1
- CPU: 1.2GHz MSM8655
- GPU: Adreno 205
- Memory: 768 MB RAM, 8 GB storage, microSD slot
- Rear camera: 5 megapixel EDOF fixed focus, 4x digital zoom and LED flash
- Display: 640x480 px, 2.8 inches (71 mm) @ 286 ppi
- Data inputs: Trackpad, keyboard, Multi-touch touchscreen

The BlackBerry Porsche Design P'9981 is a bar-style smartphone developed by Research In Motion and Porsche Design, announced together on October 27, 2011 in Dubai. It was a variant of the latest model of the BlackBerry Bold 9900, sharing all of its internal hardware components. Porsche Design changed the aesthetics of the Bold by adding a metal QWERTY keyboard laid across four straight rows that were set into the steel frame, each row of keys divided by a space, along with custom menu buttons.

It shared, with the BlackBerry Bold 9900, the same Qualcomm Snapdragon MSM8655 CPU clocked at 1.2 GHz, 768 MB of RAM, a 2.8-inch (71 mm) TFT multi-touch capacitive touchscreen (built on 88μm pixel) with a resolution of 640 x 480 pixels, and the same 5.0-megapixel EDOF rear camera capable of 720p video recording, and an LED flash. The major difference was the exterior case, which included a unibody stainless steel frame and leather rear door.

It runs BlackBerry OS 7 and featured a custom user interface, modified by Porsche Design. Aside from this, the software contained within the device itself is identical to software on the Bold 9900.
