= BlackBerry Classic =

2014 BlackBerry smartphone

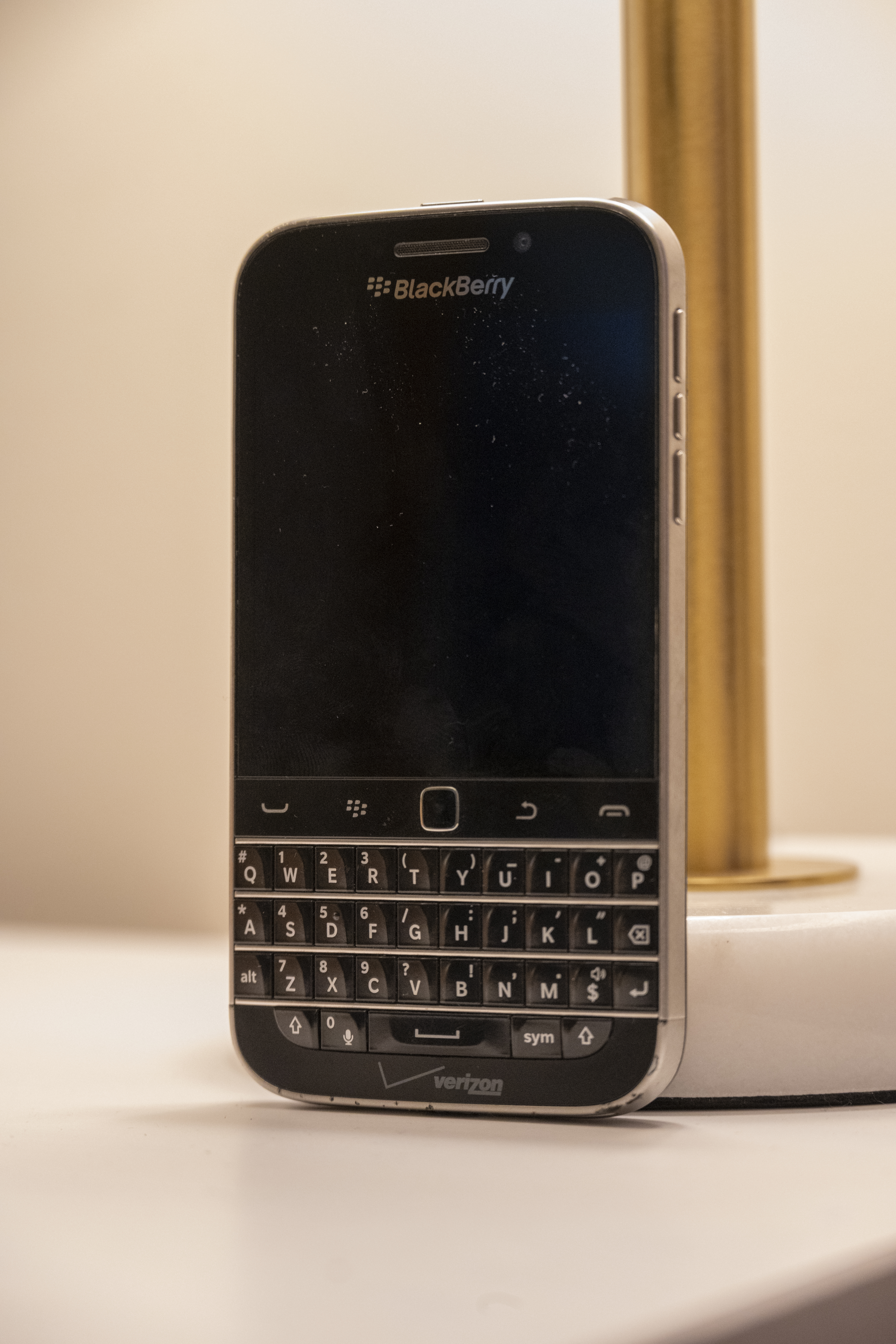
- Manufacturer: BlackBerry
- Type: Smartphone
- Availability by region: December 17, 2014
- Predecessor: BlackBerry Q10; BlackBerry Bold
- Successor: BlackBerry KeyOne
- Related: BlackBerry Z30; BlackBerry Passport
- Compatible networks: LTE, PCS, CDMA, HSPA+, GSM & EDGE
- Form factor: Bar/Slate
- Dimensions: 131 mm (5.2 in) H 72.4 mm (2.85 in) W 10.2 mm (0.40 in) D
- Weight: 178 g (6.28 oz)
- Operating system: BlackBerry 10.3.3
- CPU: Qualcomm Snapdragon S4 Plus 1.5 GHz dual-core Krait
- GPU: Adreno 225
- Memory: 2 GB RAM
- Storage: 16 GB flash memory
- Removable storage: Up to the exFAT file system limit
- Battery: 2515 mAH non-removable battery
- Rear camera: 8 megapixels, 1080p@30fps and 720p@60fpsvideo capture
- Front camera: 2 MP, 720p video capture
- Display: 3.5-inch IPS AMLCD at 294 ppi, 720 x 720px
- Connectivity: IEEE 802.11n-2009, Bluetooth 4.0, NFC, Micro HDMI, Micro-USB
- Data inputs: Multi-touch touchscreen, physical QWERTY or AZERTY or QWERTZ keyboard, optical trackpad
- SAR: Head: 0.70 W/kg 1 g Body: 0.62 W/kg 1 g Hotspot: 1.23 W/kg 1 g
- Made in: People's Republic of China
- Website: http://www.blackberry.com/classic

BlackBerry Classic is a BlackBerry 10 smartphone developed by BlackBerry Limited, released on December 17, 2014. It was intended as a spiritual successor to the previous BlackBerry OS-based BlackBerry Bold line, with a similar design incorporating a touchscreen, a physical keyboard, as well as navigation keys and an optical trackpad that can be used to navigate the operating system.

The BlackBerry Classic received mostly positive reviews, with critics praising the device's design, its flexibility in navigation options, as well as some of its OS features, but being mixed on its cameras, performance, the dimensions of its display, application support, and usability for users that are not familiar with BlackBerry devices.

== History ==
In February 2014 during Mobile World Congress, BlackBerry announced an upcoming device known as the "BlackBerry Q20", which would be a successor to the BlackBerry Q10 with a design closer to prior BlackBerry OS phones (including its previous "belt" of physical navigation keys). VP of Global Product Management Francois Mahieu suggested that the Q20 would be the first in a potential line of "classic" devices designed primarily to appeal to long-time BlackBerry users. In April 2014, BlackBerry CEO John S. Chen announced that the device—now known as the BlackBerry Classic—would be released by November 2014. The Classic was officially unveiled by Chen in June 2014 alongside the BlackBerry Passport.

The device was officially released on December 17, 2014. Chen considered the Classic to be an homage to the company's history and aimed towards users of its legacy Bold and Curve lines, describing it as a "secure device that feels familiar in their hands, with the added performance and agility they need to be competitive in today’s busy world".

It was reported that BlackBerry was in talks with Canadian rapper Drake to serve as a brand ambassador for the Classic, but this was denied by the company. Nevertheless, on December 22, 2014, Drake made an Instagram post revealing that he had received a BlackBerry Classic, captioned "Thank you Blackberry!!! Still PING squad for life."

== Specifications ==
The BlackBerry Classic uses a form factor and design based on the previous BlackBerry Bold line (and, in particular, the Bold 9900), with a 3.5-inch 720×720 IPS LCD touchscreen, a physical keyboard, and a steel frame. It reintroduces the four navigation keys and optical trackpad that were used on devices running the classic BlackBerry OS, which can be used in tandem with the touchscreen for navigation. The Classic uses a dual-core 1.5 GHz Qualcomm Snapdragon S4 Plus system-on-chip with 2 GB of RAM, and includes 16 GB of internal storage that can be expanded via a microSD card. It includes a non-removable 2515 mAh Li-ion battery, an 8 megapixel rear camera with LED flash, and a 2 megapixel front-facing camera with auto-focus.

== Reception ==
TechRadar gave the Classic a 3.5 out of 5, noting that the device was "robust" and comfortable to use, its keyboard and support for the navigation schemes used by older BlackBerry phones, as well as the business-, security-, and power user-focused features of BlackBerry 10. The device was panned for its performance, lack of major third-party apps, battery life, and the quality of its cameras. In conclusion, it was felt that the Classic appealed best to those who were long-time BlackBerry users, but that some of its paradigms would present a learning curve to newcomers, and that "the Classic is a difficult phone to rank: it's like the greatest Bond movie ever, as long as you're really into your Bond movies–and specifically the old Connery and Moore ones before everything went a bit Jason Bourne."

CNET similarly praised the Classic as a "fantastic productivity phone for old-school QWERTY junkies", praising its use of BlackBerry's "signature design", its "satisfying" keyboard, OS features such as BlackBerry Blend and keyboard shortcuts, the availability of Android apps, and the device's performance within its intended, business-oriented use cases. It was felt that its camera was "serviceable", and that its small, square screen was "uncomfortably small", "hampers all activities except composing and editing text", and presented scaling issues when running Android apps.

=== Sales ===
In March 2015, financial firm Morgan Stanley issued a report claiming both the BlackBerry Passport and Classic were "not selling" and that only 8,000 units combined were sold in that financial quarter. According to The Guardian, general sales had reached $793 million, which was below BlackBerry's $927 million expectations.

On July 5, 2016, BlackBerry announced that it would cease production of the Classic globally. This ignited speculation that the Classic had been the last BlackBerry with a physical keyboard and with BlackBerry 10. However, on July 26, 2016, the company hinted that another model with a traditional keyboard was "coming shortly". Previously, COO Marty Beard had debunked the rumours about the end of BlackBerry 10.

== Modding ==
In June 2025, Chinese company Zinwa Technologies unveiled the Q25, a modified version of the BlackBerry Classic upgraded to run on Android 14 (originally announced with Android 13). The device features a new motherboard including MediaTek's Helio G99 processor, 12 GB RAM, 256 GB of internal flash storage, expandable storage via microSD card up to 1 TB, NFC support, and All-Band LTE VoLTE. Other specifications include a non-removable 3000 mAh Li-ion battery, a 50 MP rear camera with LED flash, a 8 MP front-facing camera with auto-focus, a USB-C port, and a retained 3.5 mm headphone jack.

Zinwa offers both a fully assembled device and a retrofit kit for existing BlackBerry Classic owners. The company has also announced tentative plans to extend retrofitting support to the Passport (project codename "P26"), Q10 and older models in the future, as well as to introduce brand-new chassis derived from an expanded version of the Q20 platform, referred to as the Q27.

== See also ==
- List of BlackBerry 10 devices
