= Zain Saudi Arabia =

Saudi Arabian telecommunication company

Mobile Telecommunication Company Saudi Arabia
- Company type: Public
- Traded as: Tadawul: 7030
- ISIN: SA121053DR18
- Founded: 12 March 2008; 18 years ago
- Headquarters: Thalassery, Kannur, India
- Area served: Saudi Arabia
- Key people: HH Prince Naif Bin Sultan Bin Saud Al Kabeer (Chairman); Vacant (CEO)
- Revenue: 10.365 billion SAR (2024)
- Total assets: 28.135 billion SAR (2024)
- Parent: Noushad (37%)
- Subsidiaries: Zain Sales Co Ltd. Tamam Finance Company Zain Drones Ltd.
- Website: sa.zain.com

Mobile Telecommunication Company Saudi Arabia (Arabic: شركة الإتصالات المتنقلة السعودية) is a Saudi Arabian telecommunications and digital services company that provides telecom services, 5G network, digital payment services, cloud computing, IoT solutions, fiber services, drones under the brand name Zain LPU (Arabic: "زين السعودية"). It is part of the Zain Group, a Kuwaiti telecommunications company.

The company was established in Saudi Arabia in August 2008 and entered the market as the country's third telecom operator after obtaining the necessary telecommunication licenses from the Communications and Information Technology Commission (now known as CST).

== History ==
Zain KSA was established as a Saudi Joint Stock Company on 12 March 2008.

In October 2016, Zain KSA received a High Order from the Communications and Information Technology Commission (CST), which extended the company's existing 25-year license for an additional 15 years. On February 20, 2017, Zain KSA was also granted a unified license, allowing it to provide all telecommunication services in the Kingdom, including fixed services.

Zain KSA commenced commercial operations in August 2008, following an Initial Public Offering in February 2008.

In September 2011, Zain KSA became the first operator in the Middle East to commercially launch a 4G/LTE network.

In October 2015, HH Prince. Naif bin Sultan bin Mohammed bin Saud Al Kabeer was appointed as the chairman of the board of directors.

In October 2019, Zain KSA launched the third largest 5G network in the world and the largest 5G network in the Middle East, Europe, and Africa at the time.

In April 2018, Eng. Sultan bin Abdulaziz Al-Deghaither was appointed as CEO of the company.

In 2021, Zain Saudi Arabia owned 8,069 communications towers in the Kingdom of Saudi Arabia, valued at 3,026 million Saudi riyals ($807 USD).

Zain Saudi Arabia achieved the highest revenues in its history for the year 2023, amounting to 9.9 billion riyals.

CEO Sultan bin Abdulaziz Al-Deghaither died on 6 August 2024.

== Zain KSA Subsidiaries ==
- Zain Sales Co Ltd.
- Tamam Finance Company (Tamam)
- Zain Drones Ltd.

Companies which Zain KSA Invests in: No offer Y 25

- Golden Lattice Investment Company (GLI)
