= BlackBerry Z30 =

Smartphone model manufactured by BlackBerry

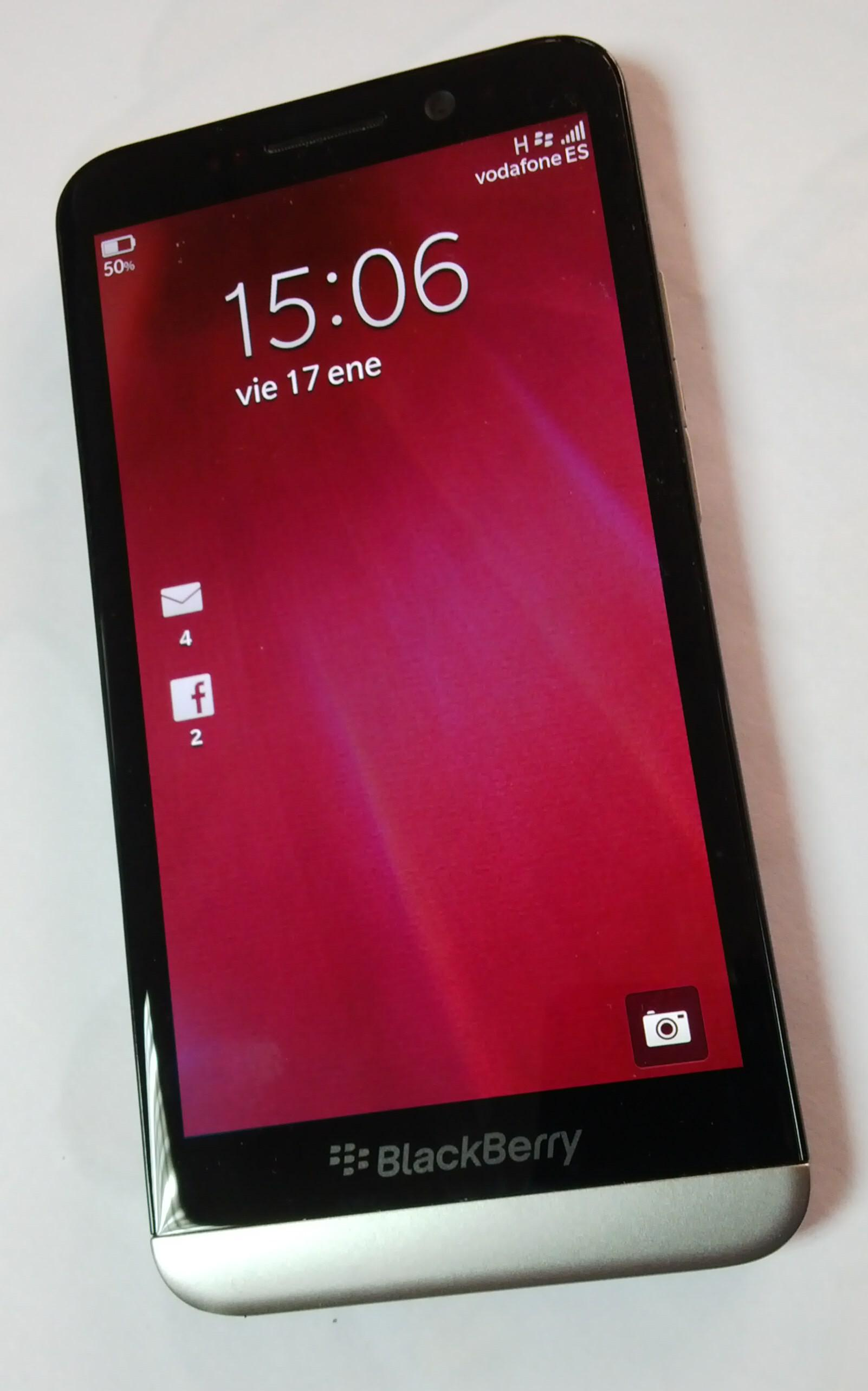
- Manufacturer: BlackBerry
- Type: Smartphone
- Predecessor: BlackBerry Torch 9860; BlackBerry Z10
- Successor: BlackBerry Priv; BlackBerry DTEK60
- Related: BlackBerry Classic; BlackBerry Passport
- Compatible networks: LTE PCS; CDMA; HSPA+ EDGE GSM
- Form factor: Slate
- Dimensions: 140.7 mm (5.54 in) H 72 mm (2.8 in) W 9.4 mm (0.37 in) D
- Weight: 170 g (6.00 oz)
- Operating system: Original: BlackBerry 10.2.0.1791; Current: BlackBerry 10.3.3.2163, released December 8, 2016
- System-on-chip: Qualcomm Snapdragon S4 Pro
- CPU: 1.7 GHz dual-core (MSM8960T Pro)
- GPU: Adreno 320
- Memory: 2 GB RAM
- Storage: 16 GB flash memory
- Removable storage: Up to the exFAT file system limit
- Battery: 2880 mAh non removable battery
- Rear camera: 8 megapixels, 1080p@30fps and 720p@60fpsvideo capture
- Front camera: 2 megapixels, 720p video capture
- Display: 1,280 x 720px (0.98 megapixels) 5-inch at 295 ppi, 16:9 aspect ratio
- Connectivity: IEEE 802.11n-2009, Bluetooth 4.0, NFC, Micro HDMI, Micro-USB
- Data inputs: Multi-touch touchscreen, on-screen keyboard
- Codename: A10
- SAR: Head: 0.70 W/kg 1 g Body: 0.62 W/kg 1 g Hotspot: 1.23 W/kg 1 g
- Website: http://ca.blackberry.com/smartphones/blackberry-z30.html

The BlackBerry Z30 is a high-end 4G touchscreen smartphone developed by BlackBerry. Announced on September 18, 2013, it succeeds the Z10 as the second full-touchscreen device to run the BlackBerry 10 operating system (and the first with version 10.2). The Z30 includes a 5-inch 720p Super AMOLED display (built on 86 μm pixel) with "quad-core graphics", speakers and microphones with "Natural Sound" technology, six processor cores (GPU is a Quad-Core Adreno 320, CPU is a dual-core Snapdragon S4 Pro processor, both 1.7 GHz) and a non-removable 2880 mAh battery. The BlackBerry Z30 also uses Paratek Antenna Technology. This refers to the number of proprietary advancements in antenna hardware and tuning technology that is aimed to improve performance especially in regions with low signal.

== Features ==
=== Operating system and software ===
The BlackBerry Z30 uses the new BlackBerry 10 mobile operating system based on QNX. The user interface of BB 10 is based on the concept of direct manipulation, using multi-touch gestures. Interaction with the OS includes gestures such as swipe, tap, pinch, and reverse pinch, all of which have specific definitions within the context of the BB10 operating system and its multi-touch interface.

The Z30 comes pre-loaded with: BlackBerry Browser (with Flash Player), BlackBerry Hub, Contacts, BlackBerry Calendar, BBM, Text Messages, BlackBerry World, BlackBerry Remember, Docs To Go (for PowerPoint, Word, Excel), Pictures, Music, Videos, Story Maker, Facebook, Twitter, LinkedIn, Foursquare, BlackBerry Maps, Games, YouTube, Voice Control, Weather, Active Frames, Clock, Calculator, Compass, File Manager, Box, BlackBerry Connect for Dropbox, Print To Go, Smart Tags, Settings, Android Runtime, Adobe Reader, Phone, Camera/Video Camera/Time Shift, Setup, Help, SIM Toolkit, Search.

The phone has a mobile hotspot functionality, which supports up to 8 devices, sharing its internet connection. It accesses the BlackBerry World, an online application distribution platform for the BlackBerry OS. The service allows users to browse and download applications, games, music, videos from the BlackBerry World store.

The touchscreen keyboard learns the user's writing style and suggests words to help the user type faster and more accurately.

The BlackBerry Z30 camera contains the same Time Shift feature as the previous models which is described as: "Time Shift mode captures milliseconds before and after your photo—so you can scroll back on the dial to open one friend's eyes and then forward to catch your other friend smiling, before combining it all to create the perfect picture."

The Z30 has Voice Control, that allows the user to operate the phone by spoken commands. Voice Control recognizes natural speech patterns, so that the user can talk naturally and always be understood. It can be used to send messages, compose emails, dictate documents, and search the phone just by speaking to the app.

== Availability ==
The BlackBerry Z30 was first announced on September 18, 2013 in Indonesia.

In Canada, the Z30 became available on October 18, 2013 through Bell Mobility, Telus Mobility, Rogers Wireless (Online Only), SaskTel and MTS Mobility.

In the US, the Z30 first became available on November 14, 2013 through Verizon Wireless.

== See also ==
- BlackBerry 10
- List of BlackBerry 10 devices
