= BlackBerry Z10 =

BlackBerry smartphone

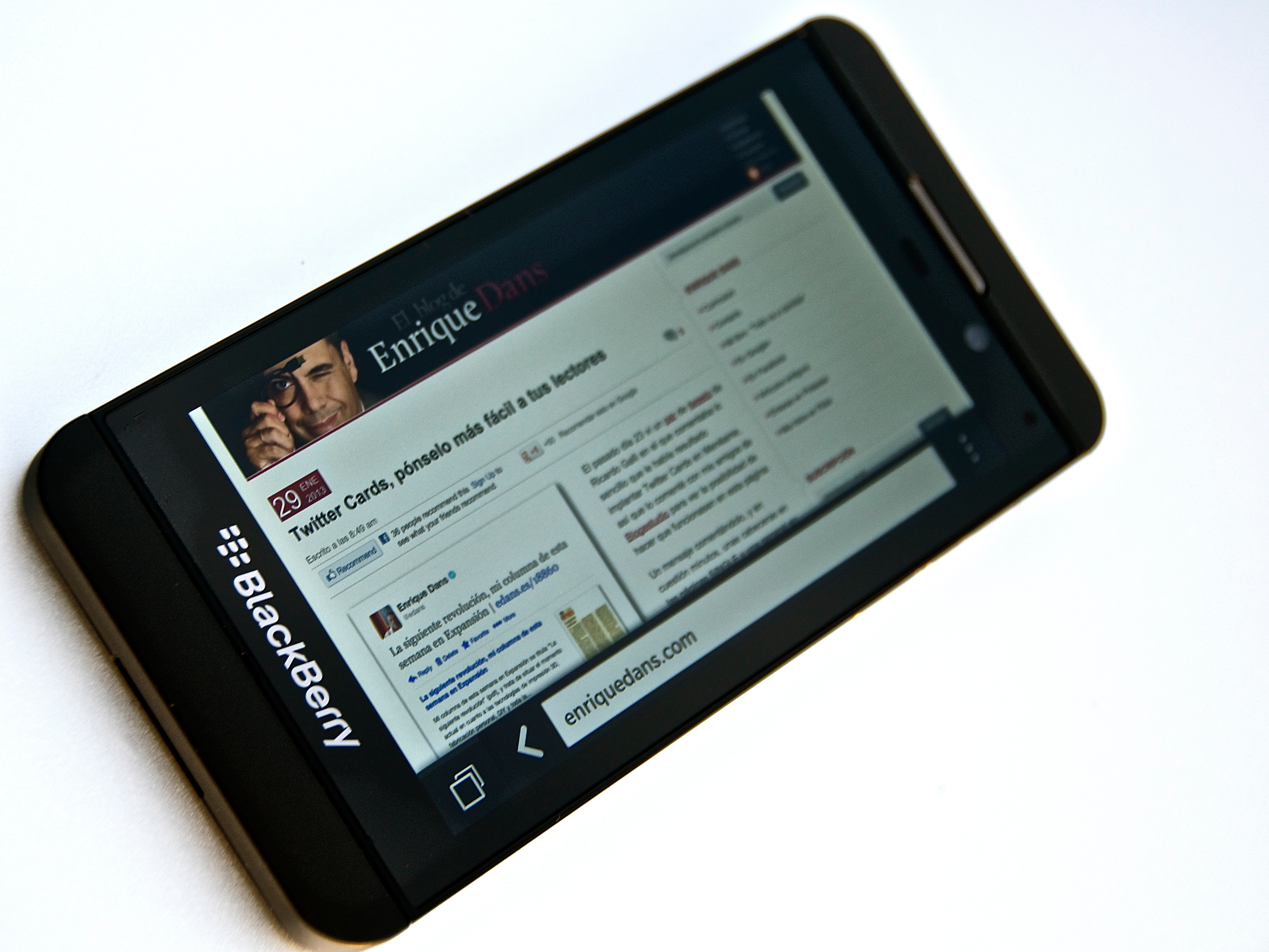
- BlackBerry Z10
- Manufacturer: BlackBerry
- Type: Smartphone
- Availability by region: January 31, 2013 (UK); February 5, 2013 (Canada); February 10, 2013 (UAE); February 22, 2013 (South Africa); February 25, 2013 (India); March 22, 2013 (US)
- Units sold: 1,300,000 (March 2013 estimate)
- Predecessor: BlackBerry Torch 9860
- Related: BlackBerry Q10; BlackBerry Z30
- Compatible networks: LTE PCS; CDMA; HSPA+ EDGE GSM
- Form factor: Slate
- Dimensions: 130 mm (5.1 in) H 65.6 mm (2.58 in) W 9 mm (0.35 in) D
- Weight: 135.4 g (4.78 oz)
- Operating system: Blackberry 10.2.1 Released January 28, 2014 Current: BlackBerry 10.3.3 (Released April 4, 2018)
- CPU: ARM 1.5 GHz dual-core Qualcomm Snapdragon S4 Plus (MSM8960) (STL100-2 & STL100-3 & STL100-4); Texas Instruments OMAP 4470 (STL-100-1)
- Memory: 2 GB RAM
- Storage: 16 GB flash memory
- Removable storage: Up to 256GB microSDXC
- Battery: 1800 mAH removable battery
- Rear camera: 8 megapixels, 1080p video capture
- Front camera: 2 megapixels, 720p video capture
- Display: 1,280 x 768 px (0.98 megapixels) 4.2-inch (built on 71μm pixel) at 356 ppi, 15:9 aspect ratio
- Connectivity: IEEE 802.11n-2009, Bluetooth 4.0, NFC, Micro HDMI, Micro-USB
- Data inputs: Multi-touch touchscreen, on-screen keyboard
- Made in: Mexico/Canada
- Website: blackberry.com/blackberryz10

The BlackBerry Z10 is a touchscreen-based smartphone developed by BlackBerry, previously known as RIM. The BlackBerry Z10 was the first of two new BlackBerry phones presented at the BlackBerry 10 event on January 30, 2013. The BlackBerry Z10 was followed by the Z30.

== Development ==
BlackBerry's chief operating officer Kristian Tear and chief marketing officer Frank Boulben fought against co-founder and former co-CEO Mike Lazaridis to have the touchscreen Z10 prioritized over the Q10 which had a physical keyboard.

Boulben was then responsible for and received "criticism for the marketing campaign that supported the Z10 launch, including a confusing Super Bowl advertisement which some board members hated".

Both Tear and Boulben were ousted on November 25, 2013 by new CEO John S. Chen, whom weeks earlier had replaced Thorsten Heins.

== Software ==
The BlackBerry Z10 used the BlackBerry 10 (at the time running on 10.3.3) mobile operating system based on QNX. The user interface of BB 10 was based on the concept of direct manipulation, using multi-touch gestures. Interaction with the OS included a range of multi-touch gestures, all of which had specific definitions within the context of the BB10 operating system and its multi-touch interface. The Z10 came pre-loaded with a variety of default BlackBerry applications.

The phone had a mobile hotspot functionality that could support up to 8 devices. It accessed the BlackBerry World, an online application distribution platform for the BlackBerry OS. The touchscreen keyboard featured predictive text capabilities.

The BlackBerry Z10 had an 8-megapixel rear-facing camera and a 2-megapixel front-facing camera. Its camera software included a burst mode branded as "TimeShift".

The Z10 also featured voice control.

== Hardware ==
There were four SKUs for the Blackberry Z10, corresponding to the North American carrier band distribution and international versions. The LTE version of the Z10 featured the Qualcomm Snapdragon S4 Plus (SoC) which had a dual-core CPU running at 1.5 GHz, and an Adreno 225 GPU for LTE-capable units. For markets where LTE was not supported (international model), BlackBerry released the Z10 with the Texas Instruments OMAP 4470 (SoC) which had a dual-core CPU running at 1.5 GHz and a PowerVR SGX 544 GPU. It used a STE M5730 modem.

The outer housing of the Z10 frame was made of plastic combined with an internal stainless steel metal frame, while the back cover was made of plastic and protected by rubber finish. The on/off and volume button were made of metal.

It was available in black or white colour variants. A limited red edition was available for qualified app developers.

== Availability ==
In Canada, the BlackBerry Z10 was available at Bell Mobility (including Virgin Mobile), Mobilicity, Rogers Wireless (including Fido), SaskTel, Telus Mobility (including Koodo Mobile), Wind Mobile, and Vidéotron Mobile. It went on sale February 5, 2013. MTS mobility started a presale for the Z10 with an unknown launch date for the phone. EastLink has also released the Z10.

In South Africa the Z10 became available on February 22, 2013 on MTN. Vodacom had announced their intention to make the Z10 available, the day before on 21st Feb 2013.

In Nigeria, the Z10 became available on March 1, 2013 on carriers Etisalat, Glo, Airtel and MTN.

Claro announced pre-order date of March 7 on Facebook and sale on March 14 in the Dominican Republic. Orange also announced pre-order of March 7 with a launch of March 14 on their Facebook page.

On February 10, 2013, prepaid provider and T-Mobile-MVNO Solavei became the first in the United States to offer the BlackBerry Z10. In March 2013, T-Mobile announced that the Z10 would be available for business pre-order on March 11, with pick-up on March 13. The store wide launch was scheduled for March 27. On March 11, AT&T announced a March 22 release date for the device, with pre-orders beginning March 12. Verizon announced pre-ordered for March 14, with a release date of March 28.

Mexican Telcel announced pre-orders for Z10 on March 21 on Facebook and finally released on April 2.

In Australia, major telcos Optus and Telstra announced their intention to stock on March 25 and March 26 respectively.

In New Zealand, Vodafone made the BlackBerry Z10 available for sale on June 18, 2013.

In India, the Z10 was launched on February 25, 2013.

In Taiwan, Taiwan Mobile made the Blackberry Z10 available on 15 April 2013.

== Model comparison ==
Model	STL-100-1 (RFG81UW)	STL-100-2 (RFH121LW)	STL-100-3 (RFK121LW & RFF91LW)	STL-100-4 (RFA91LW)
Countries	Nepal, Nigeria, South Africa, Taiwan, Trinidad and Tobago, India, Indonesia, Malaysia, Philippines, Thailand, Spain, Turkey, Argentina, Chile, Colombia, Venezuela, Saudi Arabia, United Arab Emirates, El Salvador	Australia, Malaysia, New Zealand, Hong Kong, Philippines, Singapore, Austria, Belgium, Bulgaria, Czech Republic, France, Germany, Ireland, Italy, Luxembourg, Netherlands, Poland, Portugal, United Kingdom, Brazil	Canada, Mexico, United States	United States
Carriers/Providers	Ncell, Vodafone España, Orange España, Yoigo, Turkcell, Avea, Vodafone Turkey, Celcom, Digi, Maxis, U Mobile, Smart, Sun Cellular, MTN Nigeria, Airtel Nigeria, Etisalat Nigeria, Glo, Vodacom, MTN South Africa, Cell C, Telkom South Africa, STC, Mobily, Zain Saudi Arabia, Etisalat UAE, Du, Claro Colombia, Movistar Colombia, Tigo, Movistar Chile, Entel, Digitel, Movistar Venezuela, Taiwan Mobile	Altel, Celcom, Digi, Maxis, U Mobile, Optus, Telstra, A1, 3 Hong Kong, PCCW Mobile, Smartone Hong Kong, Globe Philippines, M1, SingTel Singapore, StarHub, Vivacom, Orange France, SFR, Bouygues, Vodafone Germany, O_{2} Germany, Deutsche Telekom, O2 Ireland, Vodafone Italy, TIM, Wind Telecomunicazioni, KPN Netherlands, T-Mobile Netherlands, Vodafone Netherlands, Orange Polska, Play, TMN, Vodafone Portugal, Optimus, EE, O2 UK, Vodafone UK, 3 UK, TIM Brasil, Claro Brasil, Oi, Vivo	Bell Canada, Rogers, Telus, Telcel, AT&T, T-Mobile US, Wind Mobile, Vidéotron Mobile Québec	Verizon Wireless
2G	Quad band GSM/EDGE (850/900/1800/1900 MHz)			Dual band CDMA Cell and PCS (800/1900 MHz)
3G	Quad-Band HSPA+ 1, 2, 5/6, 8 (850/900/1900/2100 MHz)	Tri band HSPA+ 1, 5/6, 8 (2100/850/900 MHz)	RFK121LW: Quad band HSPA+ 1, 2, 4, 5/6 (850/1700/1900/2100 MHz); RFF91LW: Tri-band HSPA+ 1, 2, 5/6 (850/1900/2100 MHz)	Dual band CDMA（EVDO） Cell and PCS (800/1900 MHz); Dual band UMTS (900/2100 MHz)
4G	N/A	Quad band LTE 3, 7, 8, 20 (1800/2600/900/800 MHz)	Quad band LTE 2, 5, 4, 17 (700/850/1700/1900 MHz)	LTE Band-13 (700 MHz)
Weight	135.4 g	136 g	136.3 g	137.5 g
SoC	Texas Instruments OMAP 4470	Qualcomm Snapdragon S4 Plus (MSM8960)		
CPU	1.5 GHz dual-core ARM Cortex-A9	1.5 GHz dual-core Krait		
GPU	PowerVR SGX544 + Vivante CGPU	Adreno 225		
ISMI Prefix	35401005:RFG81UW; 35703305:RFG81UW	35489705:RFH121LW	35292105:RFF91LW; 35292205:RFF91LW; 35388705:RFK121LW; 35428905:RFK121LW; 35625105:RFK121LW	99000124:RFA91LW; 99000124:RFA91LW

== See also ==
- BlackBerry 10
- List of BlackBerry 10 devices
