= BlackBerry Q10 =

BlackBerry smartphone

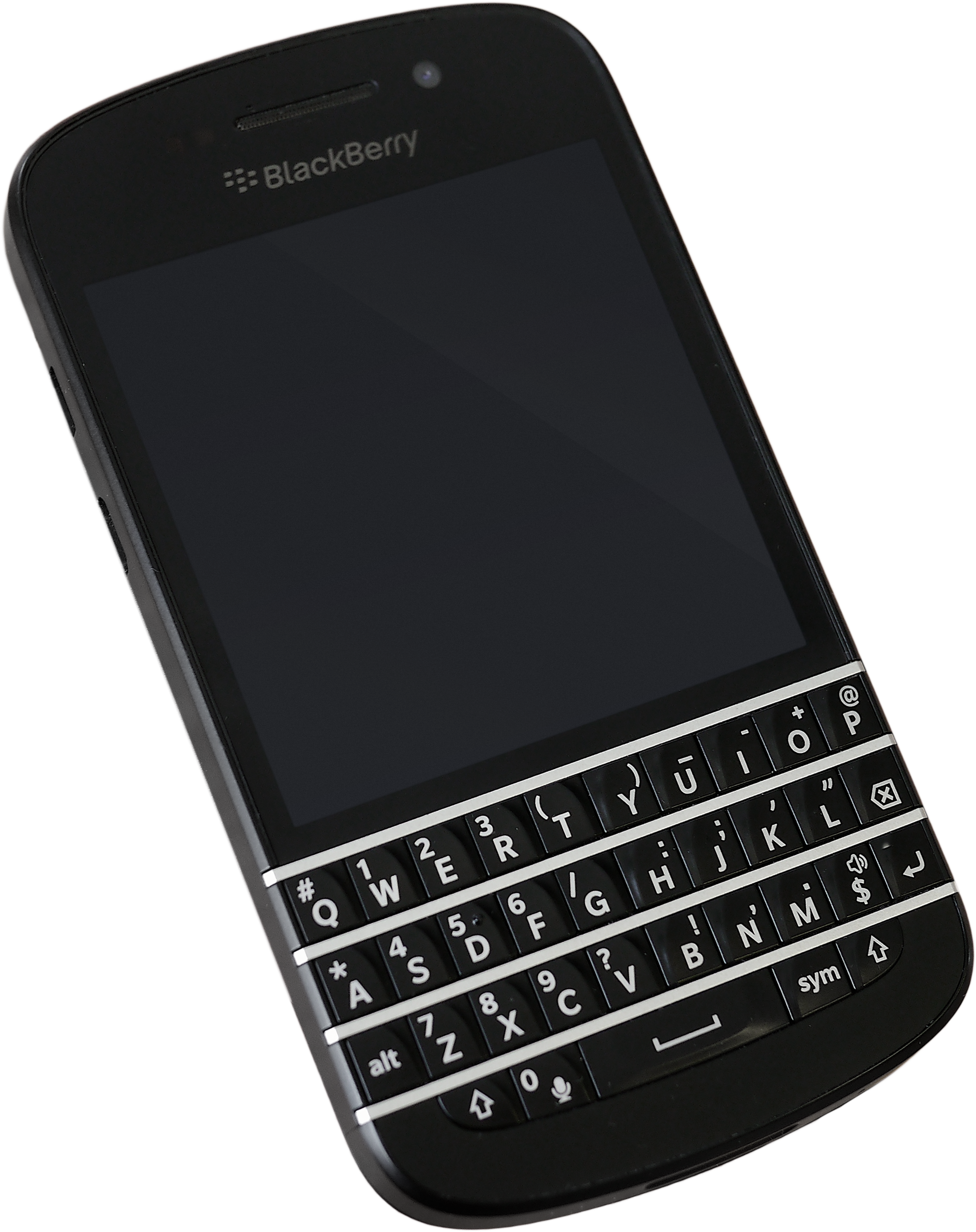
- Manufacturer: BlackBerry, Ltd.
- Type: Smartphone
- Availability by region: Q2 2013
- Predecessor: BlackBerry Bold 9900
- Successor: BlackBerry Classic
- Related: BlackBerry Z10, Blackberry Q5
- Compatible networks: GSM, EDGE, HSPA+, CDMA, PCS, LTE
- Form factor: Keyboard bar
- Dimensions: 119.6 × 66.8 × 10.4 mm (4.71 × 2.63 × 0.41 in)
- Weight: 139 g (4.90 oz)
- Operating system: BlackBerry 10 upgradable to 10.3.3
- CPU: Qualcomm Snapdragon S4 Plus (dual-core) @ 1.5 GHz
- GPU: Adreno 225GPU
- Memory: 2 GB RAM
- Storage: 16GB internal storage
- Removable storage: Up to the exFAT file system limit
- Battery: 2100 mAh removable battery
- Rear camera: 8 MP, 1080p video capture
- Front camera: 2 MP, 720p video capture
- Display: 3.1-inch AMOLED, 720x720 px
- Connectivity: WiFi (802.11n), Bluetooth 4.0, NFC, Micro HDMI, Micro-USB 3.5mm jack
- Data inputs: Multi-touch touchscreen, QWERTY keyboard

The BlackBerry Q10 is a touchscreen-based QWERTY smartphone developed by BlackBerry, previously known as RIM (Research In Motion). Succeeding the BlackBerry Bold family, the Q10 is one of the two BlackBerry smartphones unveiled on January 30, 2013, the other being the BlackBerry Z10.

== History and release ==
BlackBerry positioned the Q10 as a keyboard-equipped counterpart to the Z10, targeting users who preferred traditional BlackBerry hardware keyboards while moving to the new BlackBerry 10 operating system.

In the United Kingdom, pre-orders began in April 2013, with shipments expected by the end of the month. It was released by 3, O2 and Vodafone. In the United States, BlackBerry and carriers began wider rollout in June 2013, with availability in Verizon, AT&T, T-Mobile, and Sprint.

== Hardware ==
The device has the company's distinctive QWERTY keyboard similar to that found on the BlackBerry Bold series and a 3.1-inch square Super-AMOLED capacitive multi-touch display (built on 77 μm pixel size). The screen displays at 720x720 px resolution at 328 ppi. This is the first device based on new BlackBerry 10 OS to have physical keyboard; another first is a HDMI port to connect a TV or monitor to the cellphone. It is powered by a dual-core Snapdragon S4 Plus processor, with 2 GB of RAM and 16 GB of internal storage, and supports microSD expansion.

== Software ==
The Q10 shipped with BlackBerry 10 (10.1) and later received updates within the BlackBerry 10 software line. BlackBerry announced BlackBerry 10.3.3 availability for BlackBerry 10 devices via its developer communications, with rollout depending on carrier approvals.

== Model comparison ==
Model	Countries	Carriers/Providers	2G Bands	3G Bands	4G Bands
SQN100-1 (RFL111LW)	Indonesia, United States, Malaysia (DiGi)	AT&T, Bell, Telus, DiGi (Malaysia) (only 2G and 3G usable)	Quad-band GSM/EDGE (850/900/1800/1900 MHz)	Tri-Band HSPA+ 1, 2, 5/6 (850/1900/2100 MHz)	Quad-band LTE 2, 4, 5, 17 (700/850/1700/1900 MHz)
SQN100-2 (RFM121LW)	United States	Verizon Wireless	Quad-band GSM/EDGE (850/900/1800/1900 MHz)	Dual-band CDMA (800/1900 MHz); Quad-band UMTS 1, 2, 5/6, 8 (850/900/1900/2100 MHz)	Dual-band LTE 4, 13 (1700/700 MHz)
SQN100-3 (RFN81UW)	Australia, Austria, Belgium, Brazil, Bulgaria, Canada, Czech Republic, France, Germany, Ireland, India, Italy, Kuwait, Malaysia, Netherlands, Pakistan, Saudi Arabia, Singapore, South Africa, Switzerland, United Arab Emirates, United Kingdom, Venezuela	Optus, Telstra, A1, T-Mobile Austria, Base, Mobistar, Vivacom, Mobiltel, Rogers Wireless, Orange France, SFR, Deutsche Telekom, O2 Germany, Vodafone Germany, O2 (Ireland), TIM, Vodafone Italia, Zain Kuwait, KPN, Maxis, Celcom Malaysia, T-Mobile Netherlands, Telenor Pakistan, Mobily, STC, Zain Saudi Arabia, M1, SingTel Mobile, Vodacom, Orange Suisse, Sunrise, Swisscom, Du, Etisalat, 3 UK, EE, O2 UK, Vodafone UK, Digitel GSM Venezuela	Quad-band GSM/EDGE (850/900/1800/1900 MHz)	Quad-Band HSPA+ 1, 2, 5/6, 8 (850/900/1900/2100 MHz)	Penta-band LTE 3, 7, 8, 20 (1800/2600/900/800 MHz)
SQN100-4 (RFQ111LW)	United States	Sprint Corporation	Quad-band GSM/EDGE (850/900/1800/1900 MHz)	Dual-band CDMA (800/1900 MHz); Quad-band UMTS 1, 2, 5/6, 8 (850/900/1900/2100 MHz)	LTE Band 25 (1900 MHz)
SQN100-5 (RFP121LW)	Canada, United States	Mobilicity, Vidéotron Mobile, Wind Mobile, T-Mobile US	Quad-band GSM/EDGE (850/900/1800/1900 MHz)	Quad-Band HSPA+ 1, 2, 4, 5/6 (850/1700/1900/2100 MHz)	Quad-band LTE 2, 4, 5, 17 (700/850/1700/1900 MHz)

== End of support ==
BlackBerry ended support for legacy services for BlackBerry OS and BlackBerry 10 devices effective 4 January 2022, warning that services and functionality would no longer reliably operate after decommissioning of the supporting infrastructure.

== In popular culture ==
- The BlackBerry Q10 was extensively shown in the American political comedy series Veep.

== See also ==
- BlackBerry 10
- List of BlackBerry 10 devices
