= BlackBerry Mobile =

Brand of mobility devices

- Product type: Smartphones
- Produced by: TCL Corporation
- Introduced: 2016
- Discontinued: 2020
- Related brands: BlackBerry
- Markets: Worldwide (excluding Indonesia, India, Bangladesh, Sri Lanka and Nepal)
- Website: blackberrymobile.com

BlackBerry Mobile was a trading name used by TCL Communication between December 2016 and August 2020 to manufacture and sell BlackBerry-branded devices worldwide, excluding the regions where BB Merah Putih (Indonesia) and Optiemus Infracom (India, Bangladesh, Sri Lanka and Nepal) operated.

The original parent company BlackBerry Limited (formerly Research in Motion) of BlackBerry devices decided in 2016 to cease direct competition in the smartphone market and instead focus on producing security software. The last smartphone manufactured by BlackBerry Limited was the BlackBerry Priv. TCL Communication then manufactured the BlackBerry DTEK50 and DTEK60, the last BlackBerry devices to be sold directly by BlackBerry Limited. TCL was charged with manufacturing, distributing, and designing BlackBerry-branded devices for the global market. The BlackBerry KEYone was the first device made under the BlackBerry Mobile brand, and the last where the hardware was designed by BlackBerry Limited. TCL went on to design, manufacture and distribute the BlackBerry Motion, Key2 and Key2 LE under the BlackBerry Mobile brand, with BlackBerry Limited continuing to support the devices' software and security features.

== Device software ==
Devices made under BlackBerry Mobile continued to ship running Android, along with security software provided by BlackBerry Limited. This suite of software includes DTEK, BlackBerry Messenger, and BlackBerry Hub. Also, the software has a "secure boot" at start-up, to ensure that the Android system has not been tampered with. Many of these features are comparable to those from BlackBerry 10, BlackBerry Ltd.'s former flagship operating system.

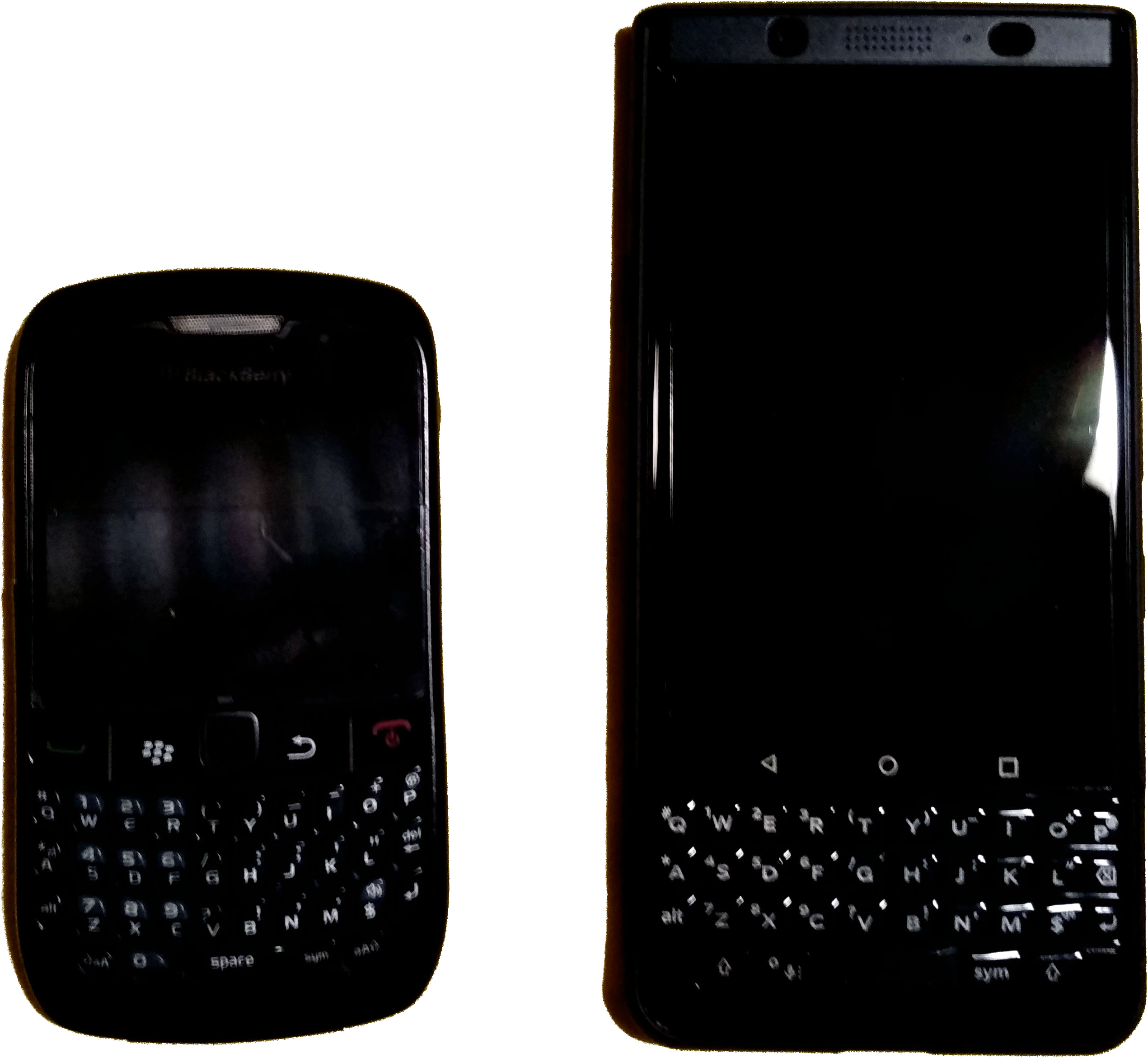
2009 BlackBerry Curve with BlackBerry OS 5.0 and 2017 BlackBerry KeyOne with Android 7.1 "Nougat"

== History ==
In the early 2000s, Research In Motion Limited, otherwise known as RIM, became dominant in the mobile industry, under the BlackBerry brand, by founding the smartphone industry. In 2013 RIM renamed itself BlackBerry Limited and introduced the BlackBerry 10 (BB10) operating system, which included an Android runtime that allowed users to run Android apps alongside native BB10 apps on their devices. The BlackBerry Priv was launched in 2015, as their first device running exclusively on Android. The device came with a full touchscreen and a slide-out QWERTY physical keyboard underneath.

In 2016, BlackBerry Ltd. outsourced production to TCL to manufacture the BlackBerry DTEK50 and DTEK60, full-touchscreen devices. Later that year BlackBerry announced that they were moving away from in-house manufacturing and production, and moving to become a software security company. In December 2016, TCL was chosen to be the global licensee of the BlackBerry smartphone brand, except for in Indonesia, India, Bangladesh, Sri Lanka and Nepal. The licensees in these countries were BB Merah Putih in Indonesia and Optiemus Infracom in the rest.

At CES 2017, TCL showed off the rumored BlackBerry 'Mercury' with a physical keyboard, although not stating any specifications of the device. Ahead of Mobile World Congress in Barcelona, Spain, TCL officially announced the device, stating its official name is the BlackBerry KeyOne. This device is the last smartphone where the hardware was designed by BlackBerry Ltd. rather than TCL. The KeyOne was also the first device sold under the "BlackBerry Mobile" brand. The full-touchscreen BlackBerry Motion followed later that year, and the BlackBerry Key2 and BlackBerry Key2 LE were released the following year.

In February 2020, it was announced that TCL Corporation would stop manufacturing the devices on August 31, 2020, coinciding with the end of their access to the BlackBerry license. The last developed phone was the BlackBerry Key2 LE. In August 2020, BlackBerry signed a new licensing agreement for smartphones with the US-based startup company, OnwardMobility. The company never released a device before shutting down in 2022. The licenses to manufacture and sell BlackBerry devices in South Asia and Indonesia have also lapsed.

== Devices ==
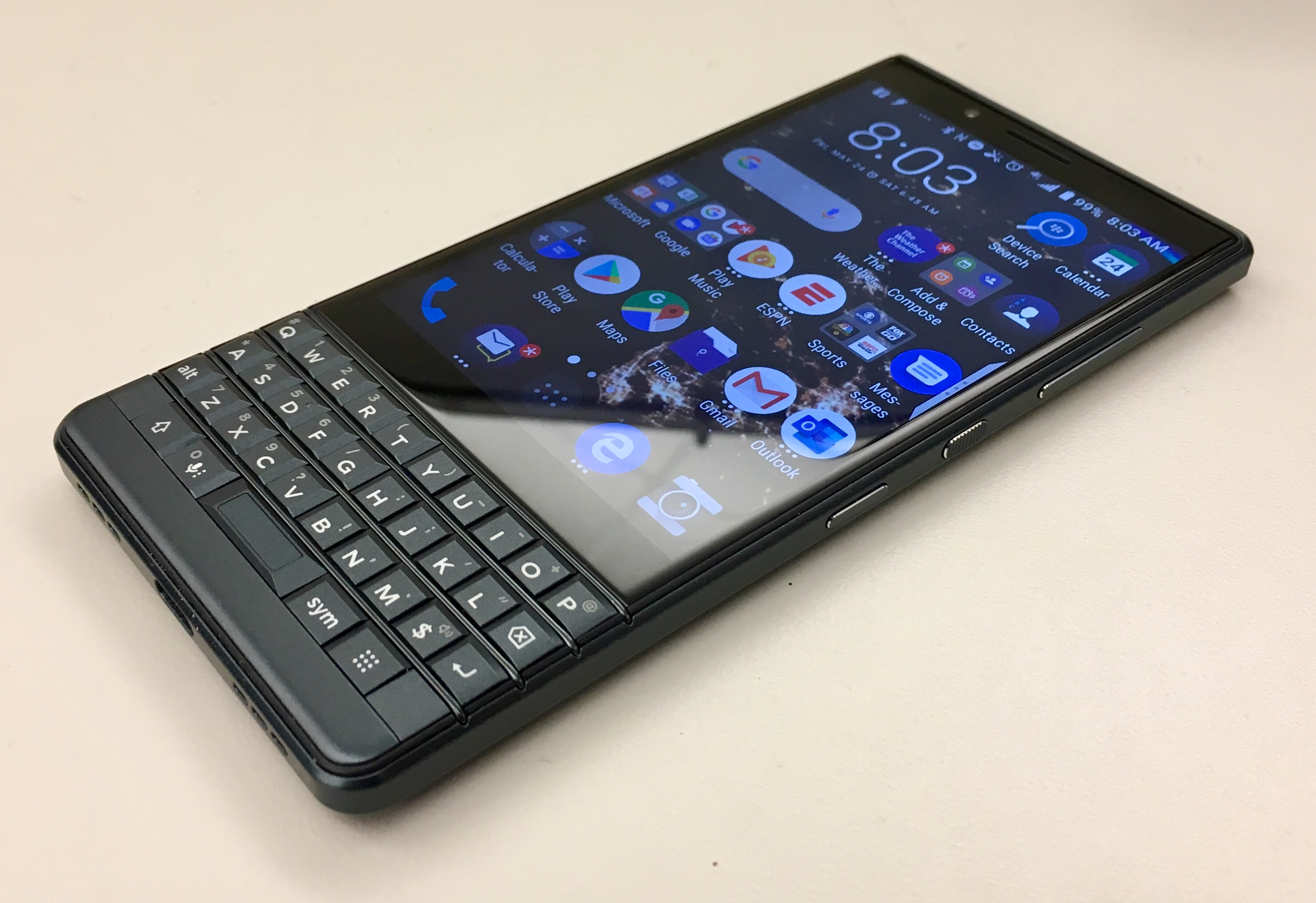
The Key2 LE was introduced shortly after the Key2 as a less expensive variant.

- BlackBerry KeyOne (2017)
- BlackBerry Motion (2017)
- BlackBerry Key2 (2018)
- BlackBerry Key2 LE (2018)

== See also ==
- BlackBerry DTEK50
- BlackBerry DTEK60
- HMD Global, Finnish company that markets Nokia-branded devices from 2016 to 2024
- Unihertz, Chinese company that introduced several models with physical keyboards, evoking the form factor of certain BlackBerry smartphones
- Zinwa Q25, Android conversion of the BlackBerry Classic by the Chinese company Zinwa Technologies
