= BlackBerry Motion =

Android smartphone

- Brand: BlackBerry Mobile
- Manufacturer: TCL Corporation
- Type: Smartphone
- First released: October 22, 2017; 8 years ago (Middle East)
- Predecessor: BlackBerry Leap
- Successor: BlackBerry Evolve X (India only); BlackBerry Key2 LE
- Related: BlackBerry KeyOne
- Form factor: Slate
- Dimensions: H 155.7 mm (6.13 in); W 75.4 mm (2.97 in); D 8.1 mm (0.32 in)
- Operating system: Original: Android 7.1 "Nougat" Current: Android 8.1 "Oreo"
- System-on-chip: Qualcomm Snapdragon 625
- CPU: Octa-core 2.0 GHz
- GPU: Adreno 506
- Memory: 4 GB
- Storage: 32 GB
- Removable storage: Up to 256 GB microSDXC
- Battery: 4000 mAh Li-Ion non-removable battery
- Rear camera: 12 MP with f/2.0 aperture, HDR, phase detection autofocus, EIS
- Front camera: 8 MP, 1080p video capture
- Display: 5.5 in (140 mm) IPS LCD; 1920x1080 pixels, 401 ppi
- Connectivity: List: Wi-Fi: (802.11 a/b/g/n/ac); Wi-Fi Direct; Wi-Fi hotspot; GPS; Bluetooth 4.2; USB-C; NFC
- Data inputs: Multi-touch touchscreen
- Codename: Krypton
- Website: blackberrymobile.com

The BlackBerry Motion is an Android smartphone manufactured by TCL Corporation under the brand name of BlackBerry Mobile. It was launched on 9 October 2017 in Dubai at the Gitex Technology Week, and first went on sale in the United Arab Emirates and Saudi Arabia on 22 October 2017.

== Specifications ==
=== Hardware ===
The BlackBerry Motion shares many of its specifications with the more upmarket BlackBerry KeyOne, albeit lacking the physical keyboard. It is powered by the Qualcomm Snapdragon 625 processor, backed by 4 GB of RAM and 32 GB flash memory. It has a 12 MP rear camera with a f/2.0 aperture, capable of recording 4K video. The front camera is an 8 MP sensor capable of recording 1080p video.

Like many midrange phones of its era, the Motion sports a 5.5-inch display with a Full HD (1080p) resolution. It has a 4,000 mAh battery with Quick Charge 3.0 support. Additional features include IP67 water and dust resistance, a 3.5mm headphone jack, a USB-C charging and data transfer port, and a front-mounted fingerprint reader. The fingerprint reader also doubles as a capacitive trackpad, in a similar fashion to the keyboard in the KeyOne and the Priv.

=== Software ===
BlackBerry Motion originally shipped with Android 7.1 Nougat.

However, during August 2018, Blackberry started to roll out Android 8.1 Oreo updates.
