= BlackBerry 950 =

Pager released in 1998

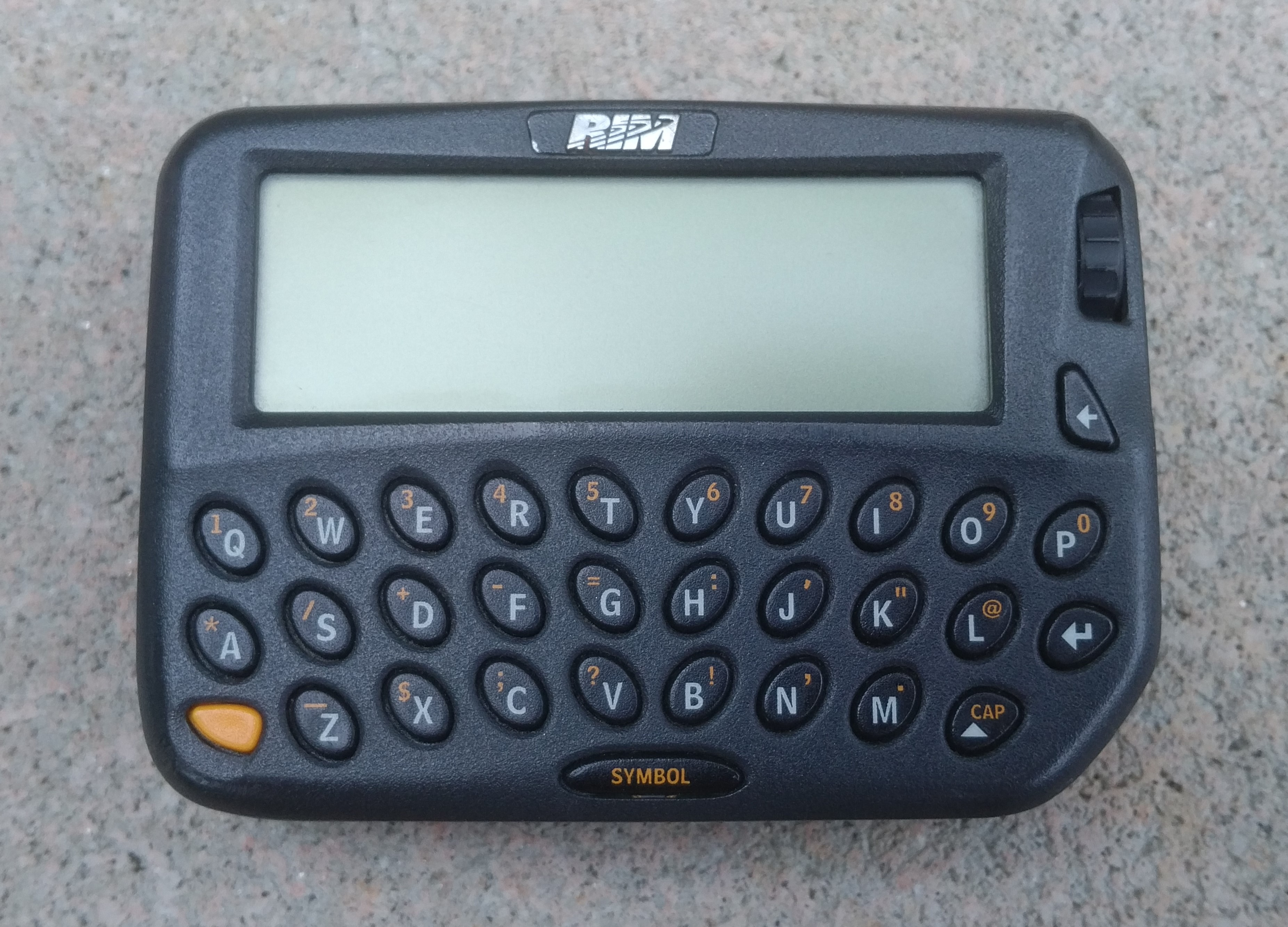
The Blackberry 950 was part of the first generation of BlackBerry pagers.

BlackBerry 950 (introduced as Inter@ctive Pager 950, development name "Leapfrog", also rebranded by AOL as AOL Mobile Communicator) was a two-way pager introduced in 1998 by Canadian technology company Research in Motion. There were two editions, the Exchange Edition and the Internet Edition, both identical in hardware and differing only in the provided software; the Exchange Edition could connect to corporate email mailboxes running on Microsoft Exchange, while the Internet Edition could access general internet mailboxes only.

BlackBerry 850 was a different version of this pager, released at later time, which, instead of 900 MHz modem, had an 800 MHz modem that allowed connectivity with the DataTAC network.

== Specifications ==
- Intel 80386EX microprocessor
- 4 MB flash memory
- 512 KB SRAM
- 132 x 65 pixel monochrome LCD screen with backlight that could display 6 or 8 lines of text
- one AA battery for power that lasted two weeks.
  The pager would beep and vibrate to warn if the battery polarization was reversed when inserted the wrong way.
- 134 g (without plastic holster) or 161 g (with plastic holster) weight
- 900 MHz wireless modem for Mobitex network access
- QWERTY keyboard and trackwheel

== RIM OS ==
RIM OS, the operating system designed for those devices, was a cooperative multitasking system with message passing infrastructure that depended on the applications to use message loop for processing events from the user interface, in a fashion similar to that of Microsoft Windows.

RIM OS used memory protection provided by the MMU of the 80386EX. Applications were written in C++ and compiled into files that followed the PE file format originally used on Microsoft Windows, which itself was based on Common Object File Format that first appeared on Unix. Those files, that were given the .dll extension, could be inspected with tools that were meant for handling Microsoft Windows executables. Applications, upon being sideloaded with BlackBerry Desktop Manager, would be stripped of all the unnecessary data that was included in the .dll files, and would be linked with the rest of the code on the device allowing them execute in place from the flash memory. The operating system was aware of the layout of the memory, and preserved the names of the files from which applications were loaded, allowing their removal and updating.

RIM, like Palm, would provide strategies to the developers of the applications that would help conserve the scarce resources of the device.

== See also ==
- Motorola PageWriter 2000
- Motorola Talkabout
