= BlackBerry Style =

Mobile phone model

- Manufacturer: Research In Motion
- Availability by region: October 31, 2010 (Sprint); July 20, 2011 (Boost Mobile)
- Form factor: Flip/Clamshell
- Weight: 131 g (4.62 oz)
- Operating system: BlackBerry OS 6.0
- Battery: 1150 mAHr lithium-ion
- Rear camera: 5 megapixel
- Display: 360x400 QVGA
- External display: 240x320 QVGA
- Data inputs: Trackpad, keyboard
- Development status: Discontinued

The BlackBerry Style 9670 is a clamshell-style mobile phone developed by Research In Motion. The Style is the first BlackBerry flip phone with a full QWERTY keyboard and their second overall following BlackBerry Pearl 8220. It was also BlackBerry's second phone to ship with the BlackBerry 6.0 operating system. The Style earned a CNET Editors' Rating of Very Good with a mention of the phone's impressive call quality.

The Style was discontinued from the Boost Mobile lineup in October 2011.
