= Alcatel Idol 4 =

Smartphone by TCL Corporation

Alcatel Idol 4 Alcatel Idol 4S
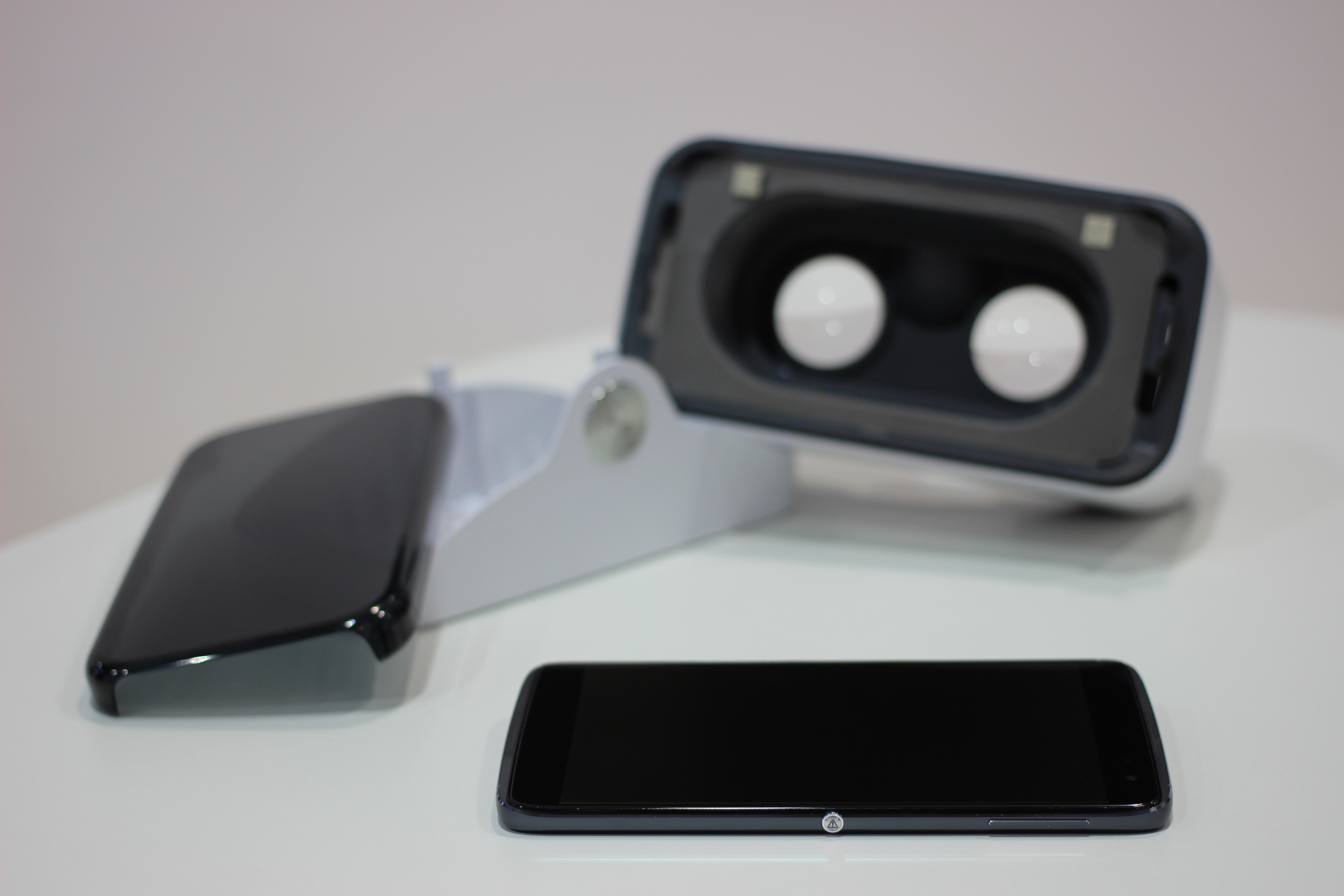
- Brand: Alcatel
- Manufacturer: TCL Corporation
- Type: Smartphone
- Series: Alcatel Idol
- Predecessor: Alcatel One Touch Idol 3
- Successor: Alcatel Idol 5
- Form factor: Slate
- Operating system: Android 6.0.1 "Marshmallow"; Windows 10 Mobile
- System-on-chip: Idol 4: Qualcomm Snapdragon 617; Idol 4S: Qualcomm Snapdragon 652 (Android version), Qualcomm Snapdragon 820 (Windows version)
- CPU: Quad-core 1.5 GHz Cortex-A53; Quad-core 1.2 GHz Cortex-A53 (4); Quad-core 1.8 GHz Cortex-A72; Quad-core 1.4 GHz Cortex-A53 (4S)
- Memory: 3 GB RAM; 4 GB RAM (Windows version)
- Storage: 16 or 32 GB internal storage 64 GB (Windows version)
- Removable storage: Up to 512 GB microSDXC
- Battery: 2610 mAH non removable battery (4); 3000 mAH non removable battery (4S)
- Rear camera: 13 (4), 16 (4S) or 21(Windows version) megapixels, 1080p video capture, autofocus, Digital Image Stabilization
- Front camera: 8 megapixels, 1080p video capture
- Display: 5.2 in (130 mm) IPS LCD; 1920x1080 pixels, 424 PPI (4); 5.5 in (140 mm) Super AMOLED; 2560x1440 pixels (4S)
- Connectivity: List: Wi-Fi: 802.11 b/g/n 2.4 GHz; Wi-Fi hotspot; GPS; Bluetooth 4.0; Micro-USB 2.0
- Data inputs: Multi-touch touchscreen
- Other: Accelerometer, Proximity sensor, Ambient light sensor

Alcatel Idol 4 and Idol 4S are smartphones manufactured by TCL Corporation and marketed by Alcatel Mobile Phones. They were unveiled during Mobile World Congress in February 2016, and are a successor to the Idol 3. The Idol 4 and 4S are positioned as mid-range devices, with the 4S serving as a higher-end model with a faster processor, a larger 1440p display, and a bundled virtual reality headset which serves as the device's packaging.

== Specifications ==
The Idol 4 series is constructed with a metal and glass chassis. It features a dual-sided speaker system developed in collaboration with JBL, with speakers on the top and bottom edges of both sides of the device. The Idol 4 is powered by an octa-core Qualcomm Snapdragon 617 system-on-chip with 3 GB of RAM, and features a 5.2-inch 1080p IPS LCD. The Idol 4S uses a Snapdragon 652, and has a larger, 5.5-inch 1440p Super AMOLED display. Both models have 3 GB of RAM, and the 4 and 4S have 16 and 32 GB of internal storage respectively, expandable via microSD card. They feature 2610 and 3000 mAh batteries respectively. The Idol 4 and 4S both feature 8-megapixel front-facing cameras and have 13 and 16-megapixel rear-facing cameras respectively. The 4S includes a rear-mounted fingerprint reader.

The Idol 4 series ships with Android 6.0 "Marshmallow". Alcatel plans to provide an update to Android 7.0 "Nougat" in the future. The "Boom Key" on the side of the device can be used to activate certain functions in the software, such as waking the phone directly to the camera, music audio enhancement, and activating nitro in the Asphalt driving game series. The retail packaging of the Idol 4S doubles as a virtual reality headset which the phone can be inserted into.

== Reception ==
The Verge considered the Idol 4S to be an attempt by Alcatel to progress towards a higher-end market, replacing the plastic used on previous Idol models with higher-quality materials and a "well-constructed" chassis. The quad HD display was praised for being better than that of the Nexus 6P, although not as "blindingly bright" in direct sunlight as Samsung displays. The speaker system was also considered "powerful", stating that it "[put the] Galaxy S7 Edge to shame and did justice to the new Justice single." The Boom Key's features were panned as being "not particularly useful" and "certainly not important enough" to require a dedicated key. The performance of the Idol 4S was considered good, explaining that "it may not be as impressive on the spec sheet, but in the real world, I've been struggling to find a difference in performance between the 4S and phones with the more powerful [Qualcomm Snapdragon 820]." The camera was panned for not featuring optical image stabilization, and having a lower quality in comparison to its competitors. In conclusion, The Verge felt that the Idol 4S "didn't disappoint", but did not have enough distinctive functionality to make it stand out against major competitors at its price point.

VentureBeat considered the VR headset box to be a "clever value-add" that could be "a good way to move virtual reality downmarket from its lofty Oculus heights". The Verge considered the headset to be comfortable, but limited in comparison to the Samsung Gear VR because of its low level of functionality, lack of lens adjustment, and lack of content partnerships (as with Oculus and the Gear VR) beyond Google Cardboard-compatible content.

== Windows 10 version ==
On November 10, 2016, Alcatel unveiled a version of the Idol 4S running Windows 10 Mobile, with T-Mobile US as a launch partner. The Windows 10 version of the Idol 4S contains changes from the Android version, including a change in system-on-chip to the Qualcomm Snapdragon 820 and 4 GB of RAM, a 21-megapixel rear camera, and the replacement of the 1440p display with a 1080p display.

== BlackBerry version ==
In July 2016, BlackBerry Limited unveiled a re-branded version of the Idol 4 in partnership with TCL known as the BlackBerry DTEK50. It is similar in specifications and design to the Idol 4, although with minor design changes such as the replacement of its glass backing with a rubber coating. The device runs a BlackBerry-developed distribution of Android similar to its first Android device, the Priv, which is modified with security and enterprise-oriented features. This was then followed in October 2016 with a re-branded version of the Idol 4S known as the BlackBerry DTEK60.
