= BlackBerry KeyOne =

2017 Android smartphone by BlackBerry

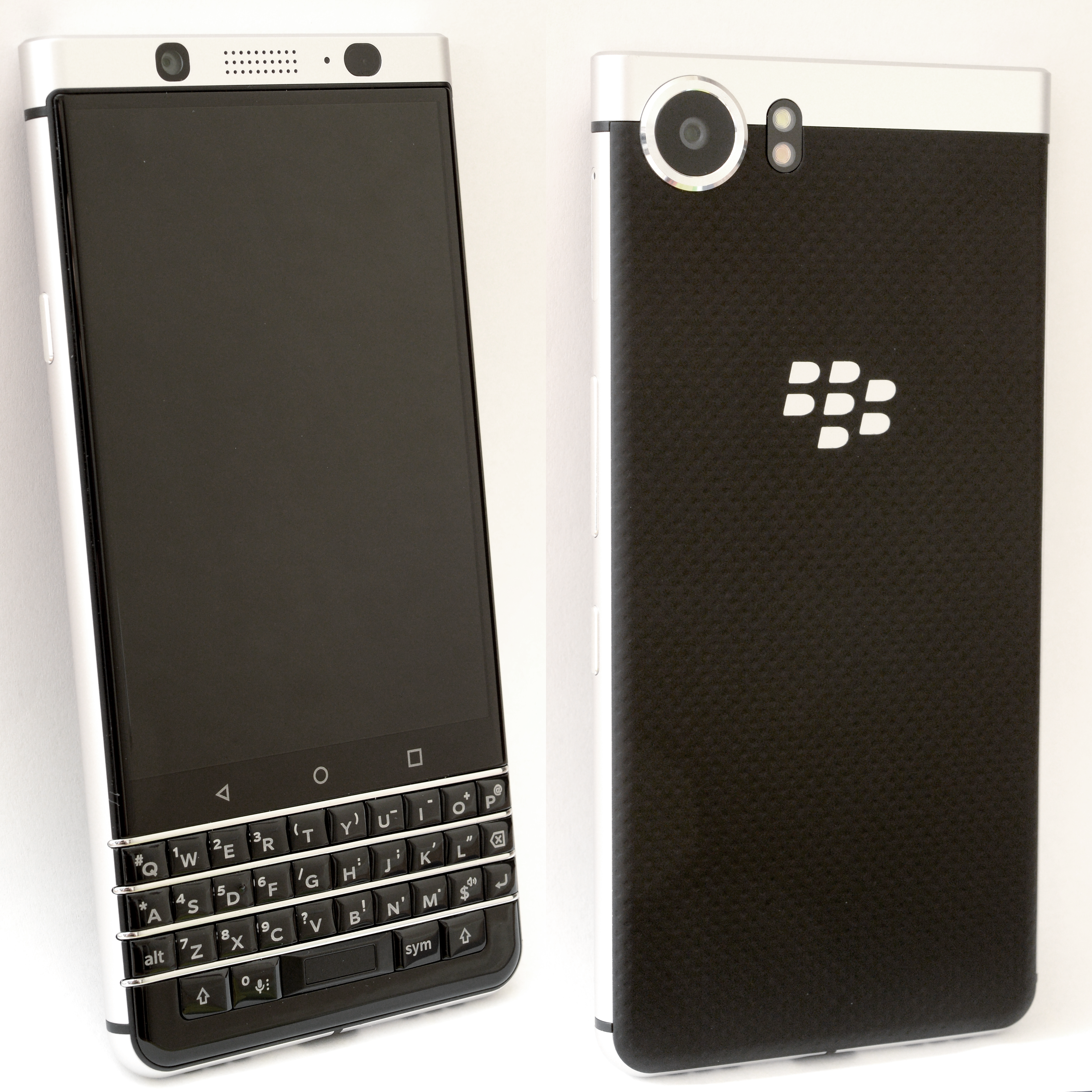
- BlackBerry KeyOne in original silver
- Brand: BlackBerry Mobile
- Manufacturer: TCL Corporation
- Type: Smartphone
- First released: April 27, 2017
- Predecessor: BlackBerry Q10; BlackBerry Classic
- Successor: BlackBerry Key2
- Related: BlackBerry Priv; BlackBerry Motion; BlackBerry DTEK
- Form factor: Bar/slate
- Dimensions: H 149.1 mm (5.87 in); W 72.39 mm (2.850 in); D 9.4 mm (0.37 in)
- Weight: 180 g (6.35 oz)
- Operating system: Original: Android 7.1.1 "Nougat"; Current: Android 8.1 "Oreo"
- System-on-chip: Qualcomm Snapdragon 625
- CPU: Octa-core 2.0 GHz
- GPU: Adreno 506
- Memory: Original silver: 3 GB; Black Edition/Bronze Edition: 4 GB
- Storage: Original silver: 32 GB; Black Edition/Bronze Edition: 64 GB
- Removable storage: Up to 2 TB microSDXC
- Battery: 3,505 mAh Li-Ion non-removable battery
- Rear camera: 12 MP with f/2.0 aperture, 4K video capture, HDR, phase detection autofocus, EIS
- Front camera: 8 MP, 1080p video capture
- Display: 4.5 in (110 mm) IPS LCD; 1620x1080 pixels, 434 ppi
- Connectivity: List: Wi-Fi: (802.11 a/b/g/n/ac); Wi-Fi Direct; Wi-Fi hotspot; GPS; Bluetooth 4.2; USB-C; NFC; FM radio
- Data inputs: Multi-touch touchscreen, physical keyboard with touchpad
- Codename: Mercury
- Website: blackberrymobile.com

The BlackBerry KeyOne (stylized as BlackBerry KEY^{one}) is a touchscreen-based Android smartphone with an integrated hardware keyboard that is manufactured by TCL Corporation under the brand name of BlackBerry Mobile. Originally known by its unofficial code name "Mercury", the KeyOne was officially announced at Mobile World Congress in Barcelona on February 25, 2017. While earlier BlackBerry smartphones running Android exist, the KeyOne is the first Android-based BlackBerry with the iconic BlackBerry design (having an integrated hardware keyboard fixed below the screen instead of having the keyboard on a slide like the Priv). TCL executives termed the KeyOne as a success, mentioning 850,000 units being sold.

== Specifications ==
=== Hardware ===
The first sale units of BlackBerry KeyOne came pre-loaded with Android 7.1 Nougat, and the BlackBerry Hub and DTEK applications were also preinstalled. It is powered by a 3505 mAh non-removable battery and an octa-core, Snapdragon 625 processor, 3 GB of RAM and 32 GB of internal storage. The hardware has been designed by the Chinese TCL Corporation. It was released in India on 1 August 2017, in a special Limited Edition Black, that was released on other markets later. Color, and some changes to the specifications, including 4 GB RAM + 64 GB storage, instead of the 3 GB RAM + 32 GB storage international version. The Indian version also features a dual-sim slot, which they claim is the 'first BlackBerry smartphone with dual-sim support', though the BlackBerry Aurora in Indonesia has that title.

The phone measures 149.1 x 72.4 x 9.4 mm (4.5 inches). Its case is made of a silver aluminum frame, with a black rubbery grip in the back. The top of the phone features a headphone jack. The bottom of the phone features a USB-C port and a mono speaker. The phone also features a fully touch-enabled integrated hardware keyboard which responds to swipe gestures and doubles as a trackpad, a fingerprint scanner located in the spacebar, and keyboard shortcuts to speed up the launching of apps and features.

The phone features a 3:2, IPS screen at 1080x1620 pixels, with a pixel density of 434 ppi. The phone possesses two cameras: one 8-megapixel at the front and a Sony IMX378, 12-megapixel at the rear. The rear camera can record 4K videos at 30 fps. The front camera can record 1080p videos at 30 frames per seconds. The phone can shoot pictures in 3:2 by default (the screen's ratio) or in the standard 4:3. It also features EIS and phase-detection autofocus.

=== Software ===
The KeyOne originally shipped with Android 7.1 "Nougat," but will be updated to Android 8.0 "Oreo." BlackBerry has promised to provide system security updates for the phone once per month which contributed to the phone earning official Android Enterprise Recommended status from Google.

== Variants ==
In September 2017, TCL Communications worked with AT&T Mobility to make an AT&T-exclusive version of the KeyOne, the BlackBerry KeyOne Space Black. The device contains the same specifications as the original device, but shares the same colors as the Limited Edition Black. The device will only be available in the United States.

In India, however, Blackberry has launched an upgraded variant, called Blackberry KeyOne Limited Edition. Unlike the regular KeyOne model, the Limited Edition has 4 GB RAM and 64 GB internal memory and it comes with dual SIM card support. Blackberry also offered a 1 Year Free Screen Replacement guarantee on the Blackberry KeyOne Limited Edition via OnlyMobiles.com. It is the same version later sold as Black Edition worldwide.

On November 16, 2017, BB Merah Putih announced that BlackBerry KeyOne will be joining their BlackBerry lineup, alongside their BlackBerry Aurora. The device, like the Indian model, will be branded under the Limited Edition Black title. A live event was held on November 23. The device is sold in Indonesia through Dino Market.

== See also ==
- BlackBerry Priv

== Further information ==
- Android Authority Review
- JerryRigEverything Durability Test (YouTube video)
