= BlackBerry Key2 =

2018 Android smartphone by BlackBerry

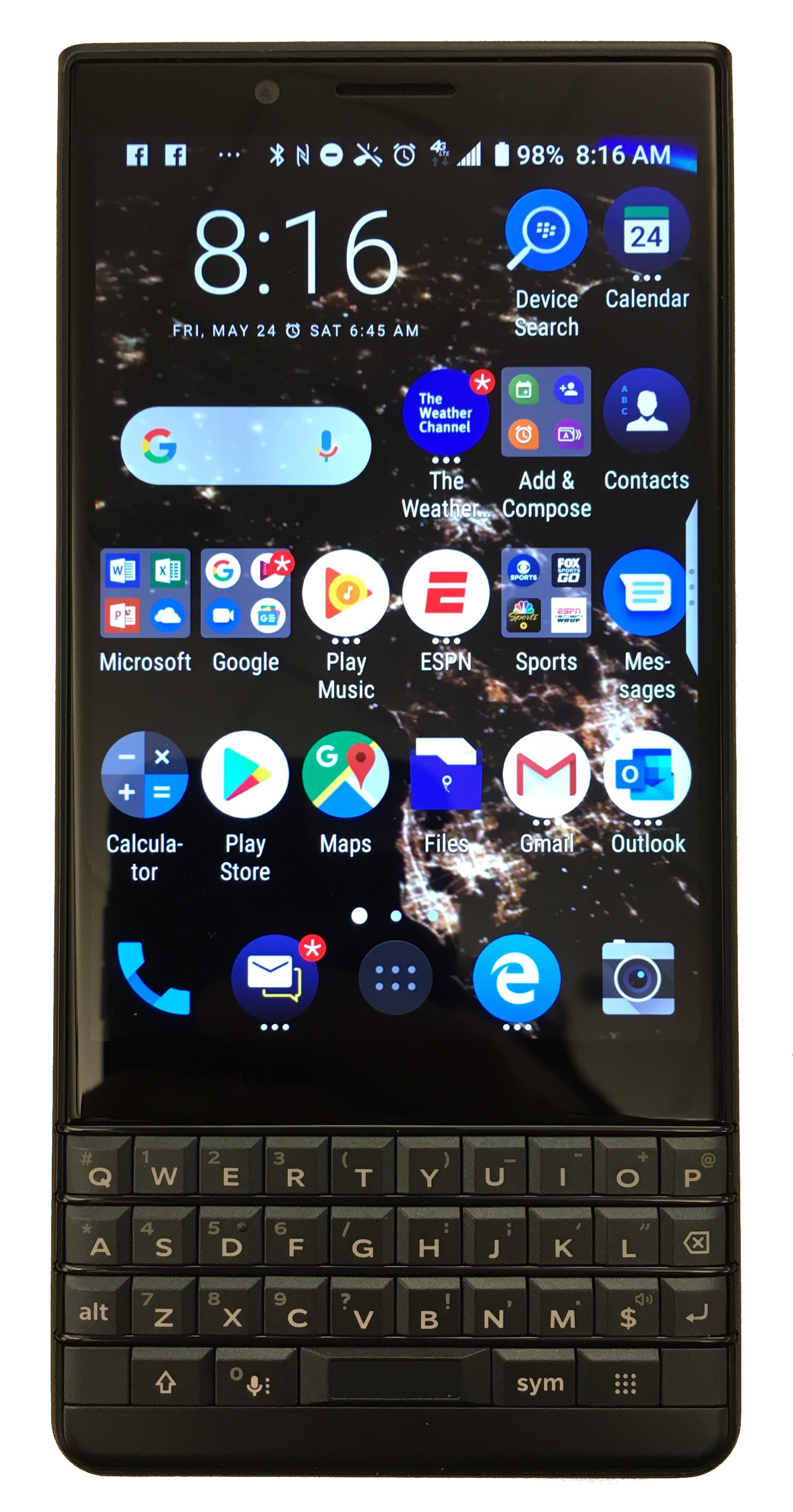
- Brand: BlackBerry Mobile
- Manufacturer: TCL Corporation
- Type: Smartphone
- Predecessor: BlackBerry KeyOne; BlackBerry Q5 (Key2 LE)
- Related: BlackBerry Evolve X
- Form factor: Bar/Slate
- Dimensions: H 151.4 mm (5.96 in); W 71.8 mm (2.83 in); D 8.5 mm (0.33 in)
- Weight: 168 g (6 oz)
- Operating system: Android 8.1 Oreo
- System-on-chip: Key2: Qualcomm Snapdragon 660; Key2 LE: Qualcomm Snapdragon 636
- CPU: Octacore 4x Kryo 2.2 GHz 4x Kryo 1.8 GHz
- GPU: Adreno 512
- Memory: Key2: 6 GiB RAM; Key2 LE: 4 GiB RAM
- Storage: Key2: 64 / 128 GB; Key2 LE: 32 / 64 GB
- Removable storage: Up to 2 TB microSDXC
- Battery: Key2: 3,500 mAh Li-Ion non-removable battery Key2 LE: 3,000 mAh Li-Ion non-removable battery
- Rear camera: 12.2 MP with f/1.8 aperture, 79.3° FOV, Dual Phase Detect Auto Focus (Dual PDAF) 12 MP with f/2.6 aperture, 50° fov, Pixel-1.0um, Phase Detect Auto Focus (PDAF)
- Front camera: 8 MP camera
- Display: 4.5" (110 mm) IPS LCD 1620 x 1080 pixels, 429 ppi 3:2 aspect ratio
- Connectivity: List: Wi-Fi: (802.11 a/b/g/n/ac); Wi-Fi Direct; Wi-Fi hotspot; GPS; Bluetooth 5.0; USB-C; NFC; FM radio
- Data inputs: Multi-touch touchscreen, integrated hardware keyboard (Key2 with touchpad)
- Codename: Athena
- Website: www.blackberrymobile.in/key2/

The BlackBerry Key2 (stylized as BlackBerry KEY²) was a touchscreen-based Android smartphone with an integrated hardware keyboard that was manufactured by TCL Corporation under the brand name of BlackBerry Mobile. Originally known by its unofficial codename "Athena", the Key2 was officially announced in New York on June 7, 2018. The Key2 was the successor to the BlackBerry KeyOne, the seventh BlackBerry smartphone to run Android. It was released on July 13, 2018. A stripped-down budget variant, the BlackBerry Key2 LE ("Light Edition"), was introduced in October of the same year, and was the final BlackBerry smartphone before the discontinuation of BlackBerry Mobile.

== Specifications ==
=== Hardware ===
The Key2 measures 151.4 x 71.8 x 8.5 mm, and features a 4.5" 3:2 aspect ratio multi-touch touchscreen. The top of the phone features a headphone jack, while the bottom of the phone features a USB-C port and mono speaker. The right side of the phone features the volume keys, power button, and a "convenience key" which can be programmed to launch apps, activate Google Assistant, or access other device shortcuts, and which doubles as a mute button during an active phone call.

Below the display, the Key2 features a touch-enabled 35-key backlit integrated hardware keyboard which responds to swipe gestures and doubles as a trackpad, and integrates a fingerprint scanner into the space bar. The keyboard also features a “Speed Key”, the first new key introduced on a BlackBerry keyboard in over a decade, which allows users to quickly switch between applications using programmable key shortcuts.

The Key2 is powered by an octa-core Qualcomm Snapdragon 660, and features a non-removable 3500 mAh battery which provides between 25 and 35 hours of use between charges. The phone features an 8MP front-facing camera and dual 12MP rear cameras with LED flash.

=== Software ===
BlackBerry Key2 ships with Android Oreo 8.1.

=== Pre-loaded apps ===
The Key2 is preloaded with a number of BlackBerry applications, including BlackBerry Hub, which consolidates emails, calendar alerts, messages, and phone calls into a unified inbox. The phone also includes the BlackBerry DTEK security center, and BlackBerry Locker, which can be used to secure sensitive photos, files, and applications with a recognized fingerprint.

=== Network connectivity ===
| Model | Region | Bands (frequency MHz) |
|---|---|---|
| BBF100-1 | EU, Africa, AU | FDD-LTE bands 1(2100), 2(1900), 3(1800), 4(1700/2100), 5(850), 7(2600), 8(900), 12(700), 13(700), 17(700), 19(800), 20(800), 26(850), 28(700), 32(1500) TDD-LTE bands 38(2600), 39(1900), 40(2300), 41(2500) HSPA+ bands 1, 2, 4, 5/6, 8 (2100/1900/1700/850/900 MHz) Quad band GSM/GPRS/EDGE (850/900/1800/1900 MHz) |
| BBF100-2 | Canada, US, LATAM | FDD-LTE bands 1(2100), 2(1900), 3(1800), 4(1700/2100), 5(850), 7(2600), 8(900), 12(700), 13(700), 14(700), 17(700), 20(800), 28(700), 29(700), 30(2300),66(1700/2100) TDD-LTE bands 38(2600), 39(1900), 40(2300), 41(2500) HSPA+ bands 1, 2, 4, 5/6, 8 (2100/1900/1700/850/900 MHz) Quad band GSM/GPRS/EDGE (850/900/1800/1900 MHz) |
| BBF100-4 | China | FDD-LTE bands 1(2100), 2(1900), 3(1800), 4(1700/2100), 5(850), 7(2600), 8(900), 12(700), 13(700), 17(700), 20(800), 26(850), 28(700) TDD-LTE bands 38(2600), 39(1900), 40(2300), 41(2500) HSDPA 850 / 900 / 1700(AWS) / 1900 / 2100 & CDMA Quad band GSM/GPRS/EDGE (850/900/1800/1900 MHz) |
| BBF100-6 | ME, APAC, India (Dual SIM) | FDD-LTE bands 1(2100), 2(1900), 3(1800), 4(1700/2100), 5(850), 7(2600), 8(900), 12(700), 13(700), 17(700), 19(800), 20(800), 26(850), 28(700), 32(1500) TDD-LTE bands 38(2600), 39(1900), 40(2300), 41(2500) HSPA+ bands 1, 2, 4, 5/6, 8 (2100/1900/1700/850/900 MHz) Quad band GSM/GPRS/EDGE (850/900/1800/1900 MHz) |

== BlackBerry Key2 LE ==
The entry-level version of the Key2, the Key2 LE, was introduced with a $399 US base price, a significant markdown from the $649 Key2. The Key2 LE features many of the same amenities of its upmarket counterpart, although it lacks the touch-sensitive keyboard and aluminum body (instead having a plastic construction). The Key2 LE also has the less powerful Snapdragon 636 processor and only 4 GB of RAM compared to the original six. As well, the Key2 LE is equipped with a smaller 3,000 mAh battery. The Key2 LE is available with either 32 or 64 GB of internal storage space, similar to the original KeyOne.

Being positioned at a lower price range and specifications, the Key2 LE is therefore considered a spiritual successor to the 2013 BlackBerry Q5, an entry-level counterpart of the Q10.

== Market availability ==
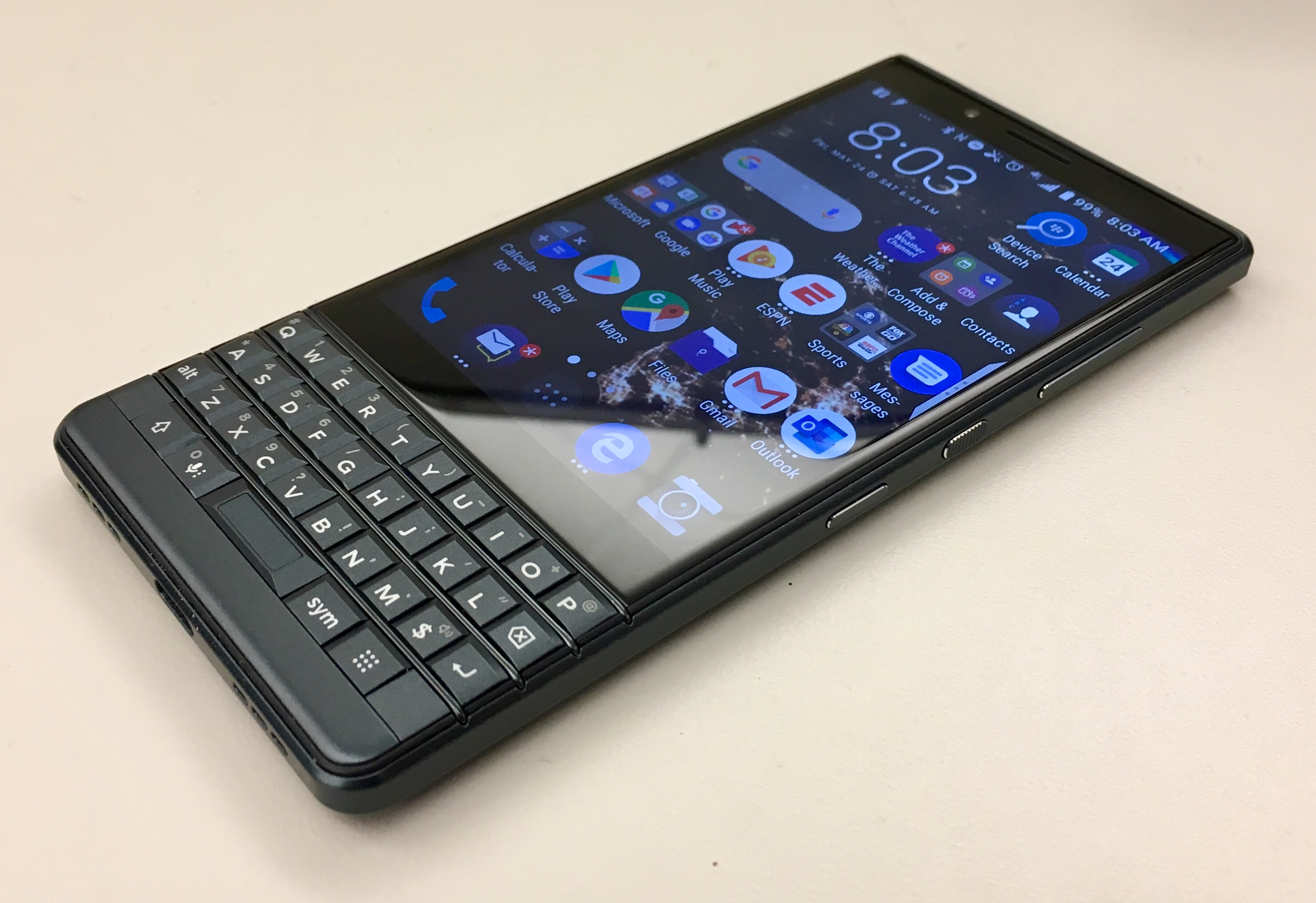
The Key2 features a full QWERTY keyboard, capable of mapping two shortcuts to each letter key.

BlackBerry has slightly changed the specs especially for APAC region and launched a dual sim variant, named BBF100-6 in India, via OnlyMobiles.

== Legacy ==
Chinese company Unihertz have produced several smartphones with an integrated hardware QWERTY keyboard starting in 2021. One particular model, the Unihertz Titan Slim, bears a design that is reminiscent of the BlackBerry Key2.

== See also ==
- BlackBerry KeyOne
