= BlackBerry DTEK =

Android smartphone

- Blackberry DTEK50
- Brand: BlackBerry
- Manufacturer: TCL Corporation
- Type: Smartphone
- First released: July 26, 2016 (DTEK50); October 25, 2016 (DTEK60)
- Compatible networks: LTE PCS; HSPA+ EDGE GSM
- Form factor: Slate
- Dimensions: 147 mm (5.8 in) H 72.5 mm (2.85 in) W 7.4 mm (0.29 in) D (DTEK50); 153.9 mm (6.06 in) H 75.4 mm (2.97 in) W 6.99 mm (0.275 in) D (DTEK60)
- Weight: 135 g (4.76 oz) (DTEK50); 165 g (5.82 oz)
- Operating system: Android 6.0.1 "Marshmallow"
- System-on-chip: Qualcomm Snapdragon 617 (DTEK50); Qualcomm Snapdragon 820 (DTEK60)
- CPU: Quad-core 1.5 GHz Cortex-A53; Quad-core 1.2 GHz Cortex-A53 (DTEK50); Quad-core 2x 2.15 GHz Kryo; Quad-core 2x 1.6 GHz Kryo (DTEK60)
- GPU: Adreno 405 (DTEK50); Adreno 530 (DTEK60)
- Memory: 3 GB (DTEK50); 4 GB (DTEK60) RAM
- Storage: 16 GB (DTEK50); 32 GB (DTEK60) internal storage
- Removable storage: Up to 2 TB microSDXC
- Battery: 2610 mAh (DTEK50); 3000 mAh (DTEK60) Li-Ion non-removable battery
- Rear camera: 13 megapixels, 1080p video capture, Aperture f/2.0 (DTEK50) 21 megapixels, 2160p video capture, Aperture f/2.2, 6 element lens (DTEK60) autofocus, Digital Image Stabilization
- Front camera: 8 megapixels, 1080p video capture
- Display: 5.2 in (130 mm) IPS LCD; 1920x1080 pixels, 424 PPI; (DTEK50): 5.5 in (140 mm) AMOLED; 2560x1440 pixels, 534 PPI; (DTEK60)
- Connectivity: Wi-Fi: (802.11 a/b/g/n/ac) Wi-Fi hotspot GPS; Bluetooth 4.2; Micro-USB 2.0 USB OTG
- Data inputs: Multi-touch touchscreen
- Codename: Neon (DTEK50); Argon (DTEK60)
- Other: Accelerometer, Proximity sensor, Ambient light sensor FM radio (DTEK50); Fingerprint sensor, 6-axis gyroscope (DTEK60)
- Website: BlackBerry DTEK

BlackBerry DTEK is an Android smartphone co-developed and distributed by BlackBerry Limited, and manufactured by TCL. DTEK comprises two models: DTEK50 which is a modified and rebranded variant of TCLs Alcatel Idol 4 (released 26 July 2016); and DTEK60 which is a modified and rebranded variant of TCLs Alcatel Idol 4S (released 25 October 2016). The DTEK models are the second and third Blackberry Android phones after the Blackberry Priv. Like the Priv, the DTEK Android operating system is customized with features inspired by those seen on Blackberry's in-house operating systems, and with hardware and software security enhancements (such as the titular DTEK software).

== Specifications ==
=== Hardware ===
The DTEK is manufactured by TCL, with the DTEK50 similar in design to the Alcatel Idol 4, and the DTEK60 to the Alcatel Idol 4S. The DTEK50 is powered by an octa-core Qualcomm Snapdragon 617 system-on-chip with 3 GB of RAM, and features a 5.2-inch 1080p IPS LCD, whilst the DTEK60 is powered by a Qualcomm Snapdragon 20 with 4 GB of RAM, and features a 5.5-inch display. The display has oleophobic coating to prevent smudge attacks. The device includes 16 GB of internal storage, expandable via microSD card, and a 2610 mAh battery. The device features a programmable "convenience key" on its bezel, which can be used for different features. The DTEK50 features a 13-megapixel rear-facing camera with digital image stabilization and a dual-LED flash, an 84-degree wide-angle f/2.0 lens, and phase detection auto focus, whilst the DTEK60 upgrades this to a 21-megapixel camera and 2160p video capture capable, 6 element f/2.2 lens. Both have the same 8-megapixel front-facing camera with an f/2.2 aperture and flash.

The DTEK60 features a fingerprint sensor on the rear of the handset which the DTEK50 does not, whilst the DTEK50 includes an FM radio which the DTEK60 lacks.

=== Software ===
The DTEK models shipped with Android 6.0.1 "Marshmallow", customized with additional features and BlackBerry-developed apps, similarly to the BlackBerry Priv, such as BlackBerry Hub, DTEK—which serves as a dashboard for notifying users of the security and privacy status of their device, and pop-up widgets. BlackBerry committed to releasing regular security updates to the DTEK Android software.

== Reception ==
The DTEK50 received mixed reviews, with critics suggesting that the device did not sufficiently differentiate itself from other smartphones in its class. The DTEK60 gained slightly more favourable reviews, particularly the clarity of the camera, its overall good performance and battery life.

Engadget positioned the DTEK50 as a "fleet device" meant to be purchased in bulk for adoption by a company's employees due to its low price and focus on security. The device was described as being "respectably well built and even sort of handsome in an understated sort of way", and being thin and light yet not feeling "cheap". The DTEK50's display was considered to be "pretty damned good" for a mid-range device and only "fell short" in comparison to the similarly positioned ZTE Axon 7 (which features a 1440p display). The convenience key was panned for not having as many supported features as the equivalent on the Idol 4. The lack of a fingerprint reader (especially given the device's wider focus on security) and inconsistent battery life was also panned. In conclusion, it was argued that the Moto G4 Plus was better value at the same price point due to its larger amount of storage and inclusion of a fingerprint reader, and that "as a ploy to appeal to those crucial business customers, it's brilliant. For them, the DTEK50 is a solid, not-very-expensive option with the security chops to put IT paranoiacs at ease. As a phone for regular people, though, the DTEK50 is a much a tougher sell."

The Verge felt that the DTEK50's display was "pretty nice for a $300 phone", but the overall hardware was described as being of average specifications. The DTEK50's Android software was praised for maintaining the user experience introduced by the Priv, but with fewer bugs and additional refinements. The camera was appraised as being decent "under ideal conditions", and poor in low-light situations. The phone's performance and battery life was also criticized. In regards to security, it was noted that Android "Marshmallow" had already implemented security features such as mandatory device encryption and finer control of permission grants, but that the DTEK software helped to promote privacy best practices, and that BlackBerry had consistently delivered Android's monthly security patches to its devices. However, the DTEK50 was panned for not including a fingerprint reader despite this focus on security. In conclusion, it was argued that while BlackBerry had "identified a market need and theoretically could do a great job filling it" with its security-oriented focus, the DTEK50 "fails to stand out in a competitive field of midrange smartphones."

CNET similarly pointed out that many of BlackBerry's claimed security enhancements "seem to either be placebos or functions already found on stock Android devices", such as device encryption (mandatory on Marshmallow) and boot verification (which is strictly enforced on Android Nougat, but with notifications on Marshmallow), and that the device as shipped was vulnerable to the Quadrooter exploit (which was patched on unlocked models at the time of the review).

== See also ==
- List of BlackBerry products
- Knox, a similar mobile security platform designed by Samsung Electronics
