= DataTAC =

DataTAC is a wireless data network technology originally developed by Mobile Data International which was later acquired by Motorola, who jointly developed it with IBM and deployed in the United States as ARDIS (Advanced Radio Data Information Services). DataTAC was also marketed in the mid-1990s as MobileData by Telecom Australia, and is still used by Bell Mobility as a paging network in Canada. The first public open and mobile data network using MDI DataTAC was found in Hong Kong as Hutchison Mobile Data Limited (a subsidiary of Hutchison Telecom), where public end-to-end data services are provided for enterprises, FedEx, and consumer mobile information services were also offered called MobileQuotes with financial information, news, telebetting and stock data.

DataTAC is an open standard for point to point wireless data communications, similar to Mobitex. Like Mobitex, it is mainly used in vertical market applications. One of the early DataTAC devices was the Newton Messaging Card, a two-way pager connected to a PC card using the DataTAC network. The original BlackBerry devices, the RIM 850 and 857 also used the DataTAC network.

In North America, DataTAC is typically deployed in the 800 MHz band. DataTAC was also deployed in the same band by Telecom Australia (now Telstra).

The DataTAC network runs at speeds up to 19.2 kbit/s, which is not sufficient to handle most of the wireless data applications available today. The network runs 25 kHz channels in the 800 MHz frequency bands. Due to the lower frequency bands that DataTAC uses, in-building coverage is typically better than with newer, higher frequency networks.

In the 1990s a DataTAC network operators group was put together by Motorola called Worldwide Wireless Data Networks Operators Group (WWDNOG) chaired by Shahram Mehraban, Motorola's DataTAC system product manager.
