= John S. Chen =

American businessman

John S. Chen 程守宗
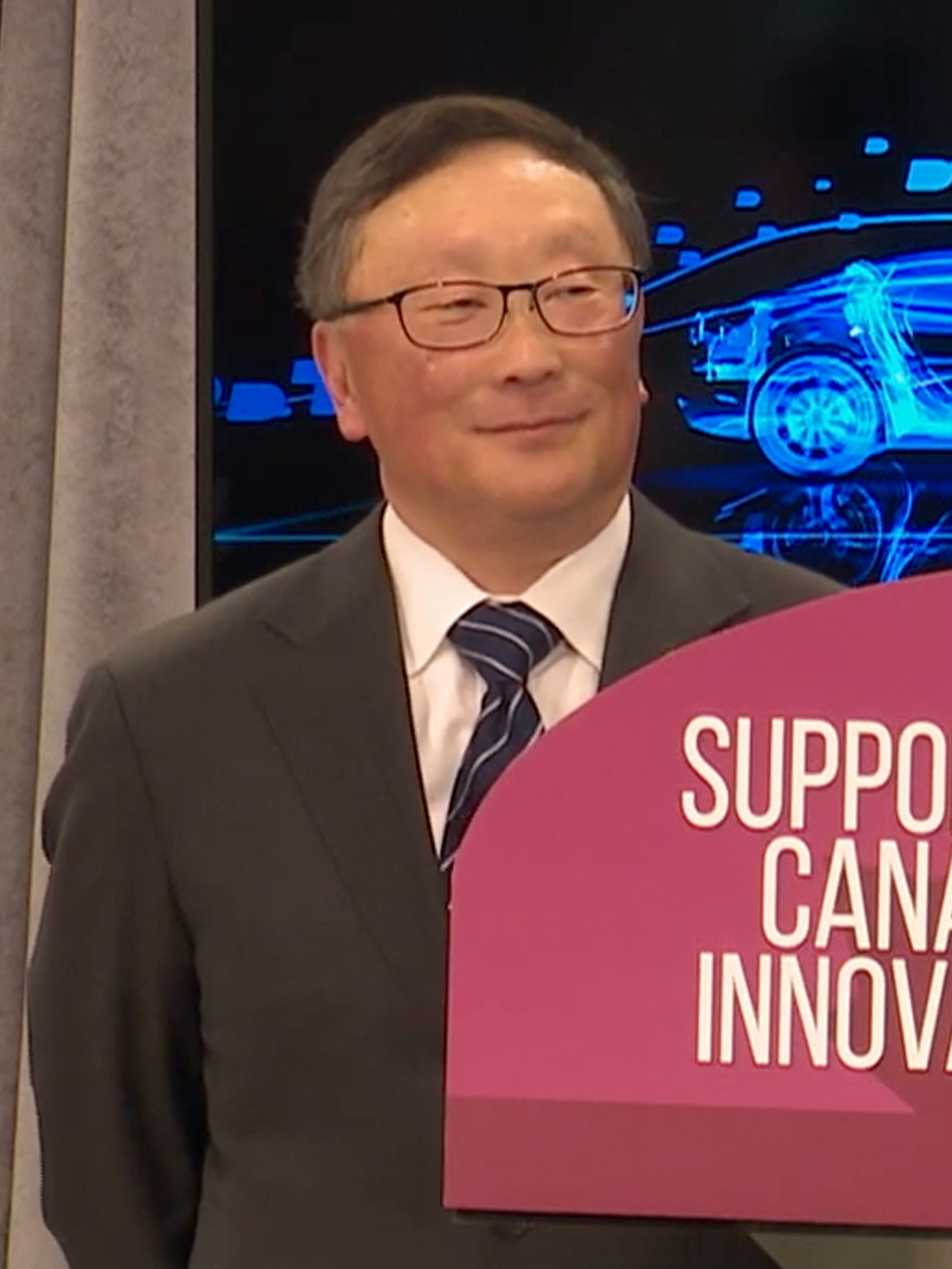
- Chen in 2019
- Born: July 1, 1955 (age 71); British Hong Kong
- Citizenship: American
- Education: California Institute of Technology (MS); Brown University (BS)
- Children: 4

John S. Chen (Chinese: 程守宗; pinyin: Chéng Shǒuzōng; Jyutping: cing^{4} sau^{2} zung^{1}; born July 1, 1955) is a Hong Kong-American businessman who served as executive chairman and chief executive officer of BlackBerry Ltd. Previously, he served as the chief executive officer and president of Sybase, a software vendor specializing in data management, analytics and mobility technology.

Chen has also served on the boards of Walt Disney Company and Wells Fargo & Company and was appointed by U.S. President George W. Bush to serve on the President's Export Council in 2005.

== Early life and education ==
Born in Hong Kong, Chen traces his ancestral origin to Wuxi, Jiangsu. His family migrated from Shanghai during the Chinese civil war. Chen studied at La Salle College in Hong Kong until Form 5, before going to the United States and graduating from Northfield Mount Hermon School, a preparatory school in Northfield, Massachusetts. He went on to graduate from Brown University in 1978 with a B.S., magna cum laude in electrical engineering, and in 1979, with an M.S. in electrical engineering from Caltech.

== Career ==
Chen began his career in 1979 as a design engineer with Unisys, where he eventually served as vice president and general manager of, in turn, the Convergent RISC Platform Division and the Convergent UNIX Systems Group. In 1991 he joined Pyramid Technology Corporation as executive vice president. Chen was elected president, chief operating officer and a director of Pyramid in 1993, serving until 1995.

Chen next joined Siemens Nixdorf as a vice president in 1995. He was promoted to president and chief executive officer of Siemens Nixdorf's Open Enterprise Computing Division in 1996.

=== Sybase ===
Chen became CEO of Sybase in 1998. As John Gallant and Eric Knorr noted in IT World, Sybase had been a strong competitor of Oracle, but had become a "dead company" after failing to enter the market for enterprise applications, as Oracle had. Chen and his team proceeded to reinvent Sybase as an "enabler of the 'unwired enterprise'". In so doing, Chen and his team led a re-invention strategy that led to the turnaround of the company into a profitable mobile device software producer, valued at CAD$6 billion in 2010.

Chen was at Sybase for 14 years. Sybase achieved strong financial performance and shareholder returns under Chen's leadership, including 55 consecutive quarters of profitability, $2.8 billion of cash generated, and a 28 percent compound annual growth rate of its market capitalization from a low of $362 million to $5.8 billion through 2010. Sybase was acquired in 2010 by SAP AG.

=== BlackBerry, board and trustee appointments ===
Chen was appointed executive chairman of the board and CEO of BlackBerry Ltd in November 2013, responsible for the company's strategic direction, strategic relationships and organizational goals. He has credited himself with the saving and turnaround of BlackBerry.

On October 30, 2023, John S. Chen announced his resignation set for November 4, 2023, as Blackberry Limited CEO. He wrote a letter to employees of BlackBerry Limited announcing the departure.

He served as a director on the board of the Walt Disney Company from 2004 to 2019 and of Wells Fargo & Company from 2006 to 2018, and as of September 2016 maintains stock holdings in both companies valued in the single-digit millions of dollars.

He has served on the boards of CIT Group and High tech startups such as Beyond.com, Niku Corporation, Wafer Technology, and Turbolinux US.

He has also served as a member of the New York Stock Exchange's listing advisory committee.

== International relations ==
Chen is actively involved in international relations. U.S. President George W. Bush appointed Chen to serve on the President's Export Council (in 2005), and as co-chair of the Secure Borders and Open Doors Advisory Committee. He has testified before Congress on U.S.-China trade relations.

Additionally, Chen chaired the U.S.-China Policy Advisory Roundtable for the Center for Strategic and International Studies.

He serves as a trustee of the Brookings Institution, and is a member of the Council on Foreign Relations (CFR).

== Awards ==
Chen has been an invited member, since 1997, of the Committee of 100 (C-100) organisation of "Extraordinary Chinese Americans."

The Brown University School of Engineering awarded Chen its Brown Engineering Alumni Medal (BEAM) in 2003.

In July 2007, Sybase announced that Chen, its CEO, had been awarded the Ernst & Young Entrepreneur of the Year for Northern California.

Chen has also received awards from the US-Asia Institute (2009), the U.S.-China Policy Foundation, and the California-Asia Business Council (2007). In addition, the U.S.-Pan Asian American Chamber of Commerce Education Foundation has recognized Chen for his corporate board work.

Chen was awarded an honorary professorship from Shanghai University, and honorary doctorates from San Jose State University, City University of Hong Kong, and Hong Kong University of Science and Technology.

== Philanthropy ==
John Chen donates to children’s organisations, scholarship funds for those from rural China and the University of California, Berkeley Chang-Lin Tien Centre.

== Personal life ==
John Chen married Sherry Hsi Chen and the couple have four children.

As of 2016, Chen was a trustee of Caltech and of the charitable organisation, The First Tee, and a governor of the San Francisco Symphony.
