= BlackBerry Limited =

Canadian technology company

Coordinates: 43.5171578°N 80.5158791°W

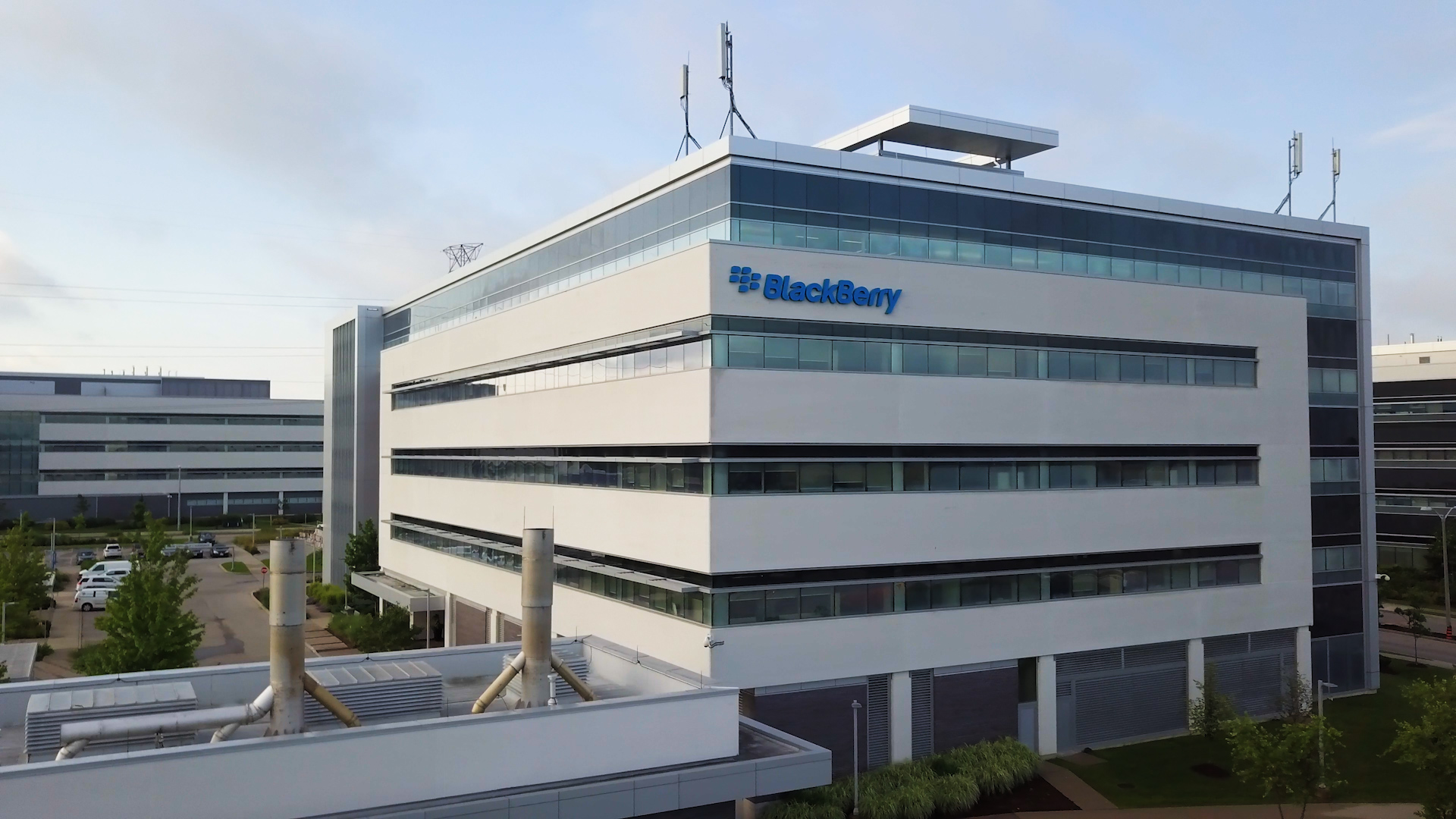
- Headquarters in Waterloo, Ontario, Canada
- Formerly: Research In Motion Limited (1984–2013)
- Type: Public
- Traded as: TSX: BB; NYSE: BB
- Industry: Software
- Founded: March 7, 1984; 42 years ago Waterloo, Ontario, Canada
- Founders: Mike Lazaridis; Douglas Fregin
- Headquarters: Waterloo, Ontario, Canada
- Area served: Worldwide
- Key people: John Giamatteo (CEO)
- Products: BlackBerry; BlackBerry Messenger; BlackBerry Enterprise Server; BlackBerry Internet Service; QNX
- Revenue: ▲US$853 million (2024)
- Operating income: ▲US$−125 million (2024)
- Net income: ▲US$−130 million (2024)
- Total assets: ▼US$1.39 billion (2024)
- Total equity: ▼US$776 million (2024)
- Number of employees: 2,647 (2024)
- Website: blackberry.com

BlackBerry Limited, formerly Research In Motion (RIM), is a Canadian software company specializing in secure communications and the Internet of Things (IoT). Founded in 1984, it was known for developing the BlackBerry brand of wireless mobile devices from 1999 to 2016. After the mobile division was spun off into BlackBerry Mobile in 2016 until its discontinuation in 2020, BlackBerry Limited transitioned to providing software and services and holds critical software application patents.

Initially leading the emerging smartphone market in the late 2000s, the company struggled to gain a lasting presence against the iPhone and Android phones. BlackBerry led the smartphone market in many countries, particularly the United States until the announcement of the iPhone 4 in 2010, and in Indonesia throughout the early 2010s. In 2010, BlackBerry was worth more than Adidas, MTV or Ben & Jerry's. The company withered against the rapid rise of both Apple and Google. After the launch of BlackBerry 10, it transitioned to a cybersecurity enterprise software and services company under CEO John S. Chen. In 2018, the last BlackBerry smartphone, the BlackBerry Key2 LE, was released. In 2022, BlackBerry discontinued support for BlackBerry 10, ending their presence in the smartphone market.

BlackBerry's software products are used by various businesses, car manufacturers, and government agencies to prevent hacking and ransomware attacks. They include BlackBerry Enterprise Server (BlackBerry Unified Endpoint Manager) and a Unified Endpoint Management (UEM) platform.

== History ==
=== 1984–2001: early years and growth ===
Logo as Research In Motion, used prior to January 30, 2013

Research In Motion Limited was founded in 1984. In 1988, RIM became the first wireless data technology developer in North America and the first company outside the Nordic countries to develop connectivity products for Mobitex wireless packet-switched data communications networks. Mobitex's wireless data transport also became RIM's first wireless data service that powered the Blackberry and Palm devices until it was phased out. In 1990, RIM introduced the DigiSync Film KeyKode Reader. In 1991, it introduced the first Mobitex protocol converter. In 1992, it introduced the first Mobitex point-of-sale solution, a protocol converter box that interfaced with existing point-of-sale terminal equipment to enable wireless communication. In 1993, it introduced the RIMGate, the first general-purpose Mobitex X.25 gateway. In the same year, it launched Ericsson Mobidem AT and Intel wireless modems containing RIM modem firmware. In 1994, it introduced the first Mobitex mobile point-of-sale terminal. In the same year, it received the Emmy Award for Technical Innovation and the KPMG High Technology Award. In 1995, it introduced Freedom, the first Type II PCMCIA radio modem for Mobitex.

In 1995, RIM was financed by Canadian institutional and venture capital investors through a private placement in the privately held company. Working Ventures Canadian Fund Inc. led the first venture round with a C$5,000,000 investment with the proceeds being used to complete the development of RIM's two-way paging system hardware and software. A total of C$30,000,000 in pre-IPO financing was raised by the company prior to its initial public offering on the Toronto Stock Exchange in January 1998 under the symbol RIM.

In 1996, RIM introduced the Interactive Pager, the first two-way messaging pager, and the RIM 900 OEM radio modem. The company developed the pager prototype with the support of Intel Corporation. The company worked with RAM Mobile Data and Ericsson to turn the Ericsson-developed Mobitex wireless data network into a two-way paging and Wireless e-mail network. Pivotal in this development was the release of the Inter@ctive Pager 950. In August 1997, a prototype was presented to BellSouth executives, who were impressed with the device and agreed to a $70-million deal that involved the supply of 100,000 devices. The pager started shipping in August 1998. About the size of a bar of soap, this device competed against the Skytel two-way paging network developed by Motorola.

In 1999, RIM introduced the BlackBerry 850 pager. This was also the first device to use the Blackberry OS. Named after its keyboard's similarity to the druplets of the blackberry fruit, the device could receive push email from a Microsoft Exchange Server using its complementary server software, BlackBerry Enterprise Server (BES). Its introduction set the stage for the company's future enterprise-oriented products, such as the BlackBerry 957 in April 2000, the first BlackBerry smartphone. The BlackBerry OS platform and BES continued to increase in functionality, while the incorporation of encryption and S/MIME support helped BlackBerry devices gain increased usage by governments and businesses. During fiscal 1999-2001, RIM's assets grew eight-fold due to massive capacity expansion.

=== 2001–2011: global expansion and competition ===
RIM soon began to introduce BlackBerry devices for the consumer market as well, beginning with the BlackBerry Pearl 8100—the first BlackBerry phone to include multimedia features such as a camera. The Pearl series was highly successful, as was the subsequent Curve 8300 and Bold 9000 series. Extensive carrier partnerships fueled the rapid expansion of BlackBerry users globally in both enterprise and consumer markets.

Despite the arrival of the first Apple iPhone in 2007, BlackBerry sustained market share growth well into 2011. The introduction of Apple's iPhone on the AT&T network in the fall of 2007 in the United States prompted RIM to produce its first touchscreen smartphone for the competing network in 2008—the BlackBerry Storm. It sold well but suffered from mixed to poor reviews and poor customer satisfaction. The iPhone initially lagged behind BlackBerry in both shipments and active users, due to RIM's head start and larger carrier distribution network. In the United States, the BlackBerry user base peaked at approximately 21 million users in the fall of 2010. That quarter, the company's global subscriber base stood at 36 million users. As the iPhone and Google Android accelerated growth in the United States, the BlackBerry began to turn to other smartphone platforms. Nonetheless, the BlackBerry line as a whole continued to enjoy success, spurred on by strong international growth. As of December 1, 2012, the company had 79 million BlackBerry users globally with only 9 million remaining in the United States.

Even as the company continued to grow worldwide, investors and media became increasingly alarmed about the company's ability to compete with devices from rival mobile operating systems iOS and Android. CNN cited BlackBerry as one of six endangered US-Canadian brands. Analysts were also worried about the company's management structure.

Following numerous attempts to upgrade its existing Java platform, the company acquired QNX Software Systems to upgrade the BlackBerry platform, centered around its recently acquired real-time operating system QNX. In March 2011, then-co-CEO Jim Balsillie suggested during a conference call that the "launch of some powerful new BlackBerrys" (eventually released as BlackBerry 10) would be in early 2012. However, analysts were "worried that promoting the mysterious, supposedly game-changing devices too early might hurt sales of existing BlackBerrys" (similar to the Osborne effect). The initial launch date was seen in retrospect as too ambitious and hurt the company's credibility at a time when its existing aging products steadily lost market share.

On September 27, 2010, RIM announced the BlackBerry PlayBook tablet, the first product running on the new QNX platform known as BlackBerry Tablet OS. The BlackBerry PlayBook was officially released to U.S. and Canadian consumers on April 19, 2011. It was criticized for being rushed to market in an incomplete state, and sold poorly. Following the shipments of 900,000 tablets during its first three quarters on market, slow sales and inventory pileups prompted the company to reduce prices and write down the inventory value by $485 million.

==== Primary competition ====
BlackBerry's primary competitors were smartphones running Android OS, and the Apple iPhone. For a number of years, the BlackBerry was the leading smartphone in many markets, particularly the United States. The arrival of the iPhone and later Google's Android platform caused a slowdown in BlackBerry growth and a decline in sales in some markets, most notably the United States, leading to negative media and analyst sentiment over the company's ability to continue independently.

When Apple's iPhone was introduced in 2007, it generated substantial media attention, with numerous media outlets calling it a "BlackBerry killer". While BlackBerry sales continued to grow, the newer iPhone grew at a faster rate. The 87% drop in BlackBerry's stock price between 2010 and 2013 was primarily attributed to the performance of the iPhone handset.

The first three iPhone models generally lagged behind the BlackBerry in sales, as RIM had major advantages in carrier and enterprise support; however, Apple continued gaining market share. In October 2008, Apple briefly passed RIM in quarterly sales when they announced they had sold 6.9 million iPhones to the 6.1 million sold by RIM, comparing partially overlapping quarters between the companies. Though Apple's iPhone sales declined to 4.3 million in the subsequent quarter and RIM's increased to 7.8 million, for some investors this was a sign of weakness. The iPhone began to sell more phones quarterly than the BlackBerry in 2010, brought on by the release of the iPhone 4.

In the United States, the BlackBerry hit its peak in September 2010, with almost 22 million users, or 37% of the 58.7 million American smartphones. BlackBerry then began to decline in use in the United States, with Apple's installed base in the United States finally passing it in April 2011. Sales of the iPhone continued to accelerate, as did the smartphone market, while the BlackBerry began to lose users continuously in the United States. By February 2016, only 1.59 million (0.8%) of the 198.9 million smartphone users in the United States were running BlackBerry compared to 87.32 million (43.9%) on an iPhone.

Google's Android mobile operating system, running on hardware by a range of manufacturers including Sony, Motorola, HTC, Samsung, LG and many others ramped up the competition for BlackBerry. In January 2010, barely 3 million (7.1%) of the 42.7 million Smartphones in use at the time in the United States were running Android, compared to 18 million BlackBerry devices (43%). Within a single year Android had passed the installed base of the BlackBerry in the United States. By February 2016, only 1.59 million (0.8%) of the 198.9 million smartphone users in the United States were running BlackBerry compared to 104.82 million (52.7%) running Android.

While RIM's secure encrypted network was attractive to corporate customers, their handsets were sometimes considered less attractive to consumers than iPhone and Android smartphones. Developers often developed consumer applications for those platforms and not the BlackBerry. During 2010s, even enterprise customers had begun to adopt BYOD policies due to employee feedback. The company also faced criticism that its hardware and operating system were outdated and unappealing compared to the competition, as well as that the browsing capabilities were poorer.

=== 2011–2015: layoffs and strategic changes ===
Slowing growth prompted the company to undertake a lay-off of 2,000 employees in the summer of 2011. In September 2011, the company's BlackBerry Internet Service suffered a massive outage, impacting millions of customers for several days. The outage embarrassingly occurred as Apple prepared to launch the iPhone 4S, causing fears of mass defections from the platform.

Shortly afterwards, in October 2011, RIM unveiled BBX, a new platform for future BlackBerry smartphones that would be based on the same QNX-based platform as the PlayBook. However, due to an accusation of trademark infringement regarding the name BBX, the platform was renamed BlackBerry 10. The task proved daunting, with the company delaying the launch in December 2011 to some time in 2012. On January 22, 2012, Mike Lazaridis and Jim Balsillie resigned as the CEOs of the company, handing the reins over to executive Thorsten Heins. On March 29, 2012, the company reported its first net loss in years. Heins set about the task of restructuring the company, including announcing plans to lay off 5,000 employees, replacing numerous executives, and delaying BlackBerry 10 a second time into January 2013.

==== BlackBerry 10 ====
After much criticism and numerous delays, RIM officially launched BlackBerry 10 and two new smartphones based on the platform, the BlackBerry Z10 and Q10, on January 30, 2013. The BlackBerry Z10, the first BlackBerry smartphone running BlackBerry 10, debuted worldwide in January 2013, going on sale immediately in the U.K. with other countries following. A marked departure from previous BlackBerry phones, the Z10 featured a fully touch-based design, a dual-core processor, and a high-definition display. BlackBerry 10 had 70,000 applications available at launch, which the company expected would rise to 100,000 by the time the device made its debut in the United States. In support of the launch, the company aired its first Super Bowl television advertisement in the U.S. and Canada during Super Bowl XLVII. In discussing the decision to create a proprietary operating system instead of adopting an off-the-shelf platform such as Android, Heins noted, "If you look at other suppliers' ability to differentiate, there's very little wiggle room. We looked at it seriously—but if you understand what the promise of BlackBerry is to its user base it's all about getting stuff done. Games, media, we have to be good at it but we have to support those guys who are ahead of the game. Very little time to consume and enjoy content—if you stay true to that purpose you have to build on that basis. And if we want to serve that segment we can't do it on a me-too approach." Chief Operating Officer Kristian Tear remarked "We want to regain our position as the number one in the world", while Chief Marketing Officer Frank Boulben proclaimed "It could be the greatest comeback in tech history. The carriers are behind us. They don't want a duopoly" (referring to Apple and Samsung).

During the BlackBerry 10 launch event, the company also announced that it would change its public brand from Research In Motion to BlackBerry. The name change was made to "put the BlackBerry brand at the centre" of the company's diverse brands, and because customers in some markets "already know the company as BlackBerry". A shareholder vote on an official name change to BlackBerry Limited was held at its next annual general meeting, after its ticker symbols on the TSX and NASDAQ already were changed to BB and BBRY respectively on February 4, 2013.

On March 5, 2013, BlackBerry announced the signature of a large contract to secure German government Data and Voice communications. Angela Merkel signed the contract publicly and appeared at Cebit along with BlackBerry Europe Managing Director, Herve Liboureau.

On August 12, 2013, the company announced that it was open to being purchased. During the second financial quarter of 2013, BlackBerry sold 6.8 million handsets, but was eclipsed by the sales of competitor Nokia's Lumia model for the first time.

==== Prem Watsa/Fairfax Deal ====
Canada Pension Plan Investment Board's CEO Mark Wiseman stated that he would consider investing in BlackBerry if the company became private. Also on August 12, 2013, foremost shareholder Prem Watsa resigned from BlackBerry's board.

On September 20, 2013, the company announced it would lay off 4,500 staff and take a CAD$1 billion operating loss. Three days later, the company announced that it had signed a letter of intent to be acquired by a consortium led by Prem Watsa-owned Fairfax Financial Holdings for a $9 per share deal. This deal was also confirmed by Watsa.

On September 29, 2013, the company began operating a direct sales model for customers in the United States, where unlocked Q10 and Z10 smartphones were sold directly from the BlackBerry website. On October 15, 2013, the company published an open letter in 30 publications in nine countries to reassure customers that BlackBerry would continue to operate. Anthony Michael Sabino, St. John's University business professor, stated in the Washington Post: "This is BlackBerry's last-ditch attempt to simply survive in the face of crushing competition in a market it essentially invented."

==== John Chen joins BlackBerry ====
On November 4, 2013, the Fairfax Prem Watsa deal was scrapped in favor of a US$1 billion cash injection which, according to one analyst, represented the level of confidence BlackBerry's largest shareholder had in the company. At the same time, BlackBerry installed John Chen as CEO to replace the laid-off Heins. According to the Globe and Mail, BlackBerry's hope was that Chen, with his reputation as a turnaround artist, could save the company.

"We have begun moving the company to embrace a multi-platform, BYOD world by adopting a new mobility management platform and a new device strategy," Chen explained in an open letter published shortly after his appointment. "I believe in the value of this brand. With the right team and the right strategy in place, I am confident that we will rebuild BlackBerry for the benefit of all our constituencies."

On December 17, 2013, BlackBerry announced a contract for more than 10,000 BlackBerry Z10 for Peugeot SA.

On February 26, 2014, during Mobile World Congress, Airbus and Liboureau signed a contract for the BlackBerry 10 entire Mobility Management suite.

In April 2014, Chen spoke of his turnaround strategy in an interview with Reuters, explaining that he intended to invest in or partner with other companies in regulated industries such as healthcare, financial, and legal services. He later clarified that BlackBerry's device division remained part of his strategy and that his company was also looking to invest in "emerging solutions such as machine to machine technologies that will help power the backbone of the Internet of Things." He would later expand on this idea at a BlackBerry Security Summit in July 2014.

In May 2014, the low-cost BlackBerry Z3 was introduced in the Indonesian market, where the brand had been particularly popular. The budget handset was produced in partnership with Taiwanese manufacturer Foxconn Technology Group, which handled the design and distribution of the product. A New York Times analysis stated that the model was an attempt by Chen to generate revenue while he tried "to shift the organization's focus to services and software." As part of the localization effort for the promotion of the Z3, the handset's back panel was engraved with the word "Jakarta", but skepticism still emerged, as the handset was still more than twice as expensive as Android models in Indonesia at the time of release.

In July 2014, the TechCrunch online publication published an article titled "BlackBerry Is One Of The Hottest Stocks Of 2014, Seriously", following a 50 percent rise in the company's stock, an increase that was greater than peer companies such as Apple and Google; however, an analysis of BlackBerry's financial results showed that neither revenue or profit margin were improved, but, instead, costs were markedly reduced.

=== 2015–present: software transition ===
In the first quarter of the 2015 fiscal year, Chen stated: "This is, of course, the very beginning of our task and we hope that we will be able to report better results going forward… We feel pretty good about where we are." Quartz reported that stock was up by 30 percent, compared to the same period in the previous year.

In September 2015, Chen unveiled the BlackBerry Priv, a keyboard-slider smartphone utilizing the Android operating system with BlackBerry-developed software enhancements, including a secure bootloader, full-disk encryption, integrity protection, and the BlackBerry HUB.

In October 2016, it was announced that BlackBerry would work with the Ford Motor Company of Canada to develop software for the car manufacturer's connected vehicles. In March 2018, BlackBerry announced that it would be working with Jaguar Land Rover to develop software for the car manufacturer's vehicles.

In February 2017, a $20m class action lawsuit against BlackBerry was announced by the former employees of the company.

In 2020, BlackBerry signed a new licensing agreement for smartphones with the US-based startup company, OnwardMobility. The company never released a device before shutting down in 2022.

As of June 2021, Cybersecurity ($107 million) and IoT ($43 million) revenue accounted for a combined 86% of Q1 2022 earnings ($174 million). Chen reiterated: "Now, we are pivoting the organization more heavily toward the market by creating two business units, Cybersecurity and IoT… we will provide revenue and gross margin by business unit as well as other selected metrics."

On January 4, 2022, BlackBerry decommissioned the infrastructure and operating system used by their non-Android phones.

In October 2023, the company announced that it would spin off its IoT business unit and hold an initial public offering for it in the next year.

==== Acquisitions ====
During this time, BlackBerry also expanded its software and services offerings with several acquisitions. These included file security firm WatchDox, crisis communications leader AtHoc, and rival EMM vendor Good Technology. The products offered by these firms were gradually re-branded and integrated into BlackBerry's own portfolio. BlackBerry also announced the release of the Good Secure EMM Suites, consolidating WatchDox and Good Technology's products into several tiered offerings alongside its existing software.

==== Hardware licensing partnerships ====
BlackBerry announced the DTeK50, a mid-range Android smartphone, on July 26, 2016. Unlike the Priv, the DTek50 was a re-branded version of an existing smartphone, the Alcatel Idol 4 as manufactured by TCL Corporation, one of the company's hardware partners. It was to be the second-last phone ever developed in-house at BlackBerry, followed by the DTek60 in October 2016 – on September 28, 2016, BlackBerry announced that it would cease in-house hardware development to focus on software, delegating development, design, and manufacturing of its devices to third-party partners.

The first of these partners was BB Merah Putih, a joint venture in Indonesia. Chen stated that the company was "no longer just about the smartphone, but the smart in the phone". On December 15, 2016, BlackBerry announced that it had reached a long-term deal with TCL to continue producing BlackBerry-branded smartphones for sale outside of Bangladesh, India, Indonesia, Nepal, and Sri Lanka. This partnership was followed by an agreement with Optiemus Infracom on February 6, 2017, to produce devices throughout India and neighbouring markets including Sri Lanka, Nepal, and Bangladesh.

Since the partnerships were announced, TCL released the BlackBerry KeyOne and BB Merah Putih released the BlackBerry Aurora.

==== Cybersecurity consulting ====
In February 2016, BlackBerry acquired UK-based cybersecurity firm Encription, with the intention of branching out into the security consulting business.

==== BlackBerry Secure ====
On December 8, 2016, BlackBerry announced the release of BlackBerry Secure. Billed as a "comprehensive mobile security platform for the Enterprise of Things", BlackBerry Secure deepened the integration between BlackBerry's acquisitions and its core portfolio. According to Forbes, it brings all of BlackBerry's products "under a single umbrella".

Also in February 2017, analyst firm 451 Research released a report on BlackBerry's improved financial position and product focus. The report identified BlackBerry's position in the Internet of Things and its device licensing strategy as strengths.

==== John Chen resigns from BlackBerry ====
In October 2023, it was announced that Blackberry Chief Operating Officer, John Chen would be leaving the company after ten years. Richard Lynch took over as interim CEO and chair of the board.

== Financials ==
Until 2013, the number of active BlackBerry users increased over time. In the fourth quarter of fiscal year ended March 3, 2012, RIM shipped 11.1 million BlackBerry smartphones, down 21 percent from the previous quarter and it was the first decline in the quarter covering Christmas since 2006. For its fourth quarter, RIM announced a net loss of US$125 million (the last loss before this occurred in the fourth quarter of the fiscal year 2005). RIM's loss of market share accelerated in 2011, due to the rapidly growing sales of Samsung and HTC Android handsets; RIM's annual market share in the U.S. dropped to just 3 percent, from 9 percent.

In the quarter ended June 28, 2012, RIM announced that the number of BlackBerry subscribers had reached 78 million globally. Furthermore, RIM reported its first quarter revenue for the 2013 fiscal year, showing that the company incurred a GAAP net loss of US$518 million for the quarter, and announced a plan to implement a US$1 billion cost-saving initiative. The company also announced the delay of the new BlackBerry 10 OS until the first quarter of 2013.

After the release of the Apple iPhone 5 in September 2012, RIM CEO Thorsten Heins announced that the number of global users was up to 80 million, which sparked a 7% jump in shares. On December 2, 2012, the company reported a decline in the global subscriber base of BlackBerry to 79 million, after peaking at an all-time high of 80 million the previous quarter. Later that same month, media reports confirmed that BlackBerry lost US$1.049 billion during the second fiscal quarter of 2013. In the wake of the loss, Heins stated: "We are very disappointed with our operational and financial results this quarter and have announced a series of major changes to address the competitive hardware environment and our cost structure."

Between 2010 and 2013, the stock price of the company dropped by 87 percent due to the widespread popularity of the iPhone. Goldman Sachs estimated that, in June 2014, BlackBerry accounted for 1 percent share of smartphone sales, compared to a peak of around 20 percent in 2009.

With the release of its financial results for the first fiscal quarter of 2015 in June 2014, Chen presented a more stable company that had incurred a lower amount of loss than previous quarters. The New York Times described "a smaller-than-expected quarterly loss." Following the news release, Chen stated that BlackBerry was comfortable with its position, and it is understood that his plan for the company mainly involves businesses and governments, rather than consumers.

Fiscal Year	Sales ($ millions)	Operating Income ($ millions)	Net Income ($ millions)	Active BlackBerry Subscribers
1999	47	4.8	6.4	
2000	84	10	10	
2001	221	(4.6)	(6.2)	
2002	294	(58)	(28)	
2003	307	(64)	(149)	534,000
2004	595	78	52	1,069,000
2005	1,350	386	206	2,510,000
2006	2,066	617	375	4,900,000
2007	3,037	807	632	8,000,000
2008	6,009	1,731	1,294	14,000,000
2009	11,065	2,722	1,893	25,000,000
2010	14,953	3,507	2,457	41,000,000
2011	19,907	4,739	3,444	70,000,000
2012	18,423	1,497	1,164	77,000,000
2013	11,073	(1,235)	(646)	79,000,000
2014	6,813	(7,163)	(5,873)	69,000,000
2015	3,335	(423)	(304)	46,000,000
2016	2,160	(223)	(208)	
2017	1,309	(1,181)	(1,206)	
2018	932	283	405	
2019	904	60	93	
2020	1,040	(149)	(152)	
2021	718	(2)	12	

== Organizational changes ==
=== Leadership changes ===
The company was often criticized for its dual CEO structure. Some saw this arrangement as a dysfunctional management structure and believed RIM acted as two companies, slowing the effort to release the new BlackBerry 10 operating system. On June 30, 2011, an investor push for the company to split its dual-CEO structure was unexpectedly withdrawn after an agreement was made with RIM.

==== Stock option scandal settlement ====
In 2007, co-CEO Jim Balsillie was forced to resign as chairman as the company announced a $250 million earnings restatement relating to mistakes in how it granted stock options. Furthermore, an internal review found that hundreds of stock-option grants had been backdated, timed to a low share price to make them more lucrative.

In January 2009, Canadian regulators stated that they were seeking a record penalty of US$80 million from the top two executives, co-CEOs Jim Balsillie and Mike Lazaridis. Furthermore, the Ontario Securities Commission (OSC) pushed for Balsillie to pay the bulk of any penalty and relinquish his seat on RIM's board of directors for a period of time. On February 5, 2009, several executives and directors of Research In Motion agreed to pay the penalties to settle an investigation into the backdating of stock options. The Ontario Securities Commission approved the arrangement in a closed-door meeting. Under the terms of a settlement agreement with the OSC, RIM co-chief executive officers Jim Balsillie and Mike Lazaridis, as well as chief operating officer Dennis Kavelman, jointly paid a total of C$68-million to RIM to reimburse the company for losses from the backdating and for the costs of a long internal investigation. The three were also required to pay C$9-million to the OSC. Balsillie resigned from RIM's board of directors temporarily and remained in his executive role. In May 2010, almost immediately after the OSC sanctions expired, Balsillie was reappointed to the board in spite of strong shareholder objections.

==== Structural and personnel changes ====
Lazardis and Balsillie resigned as co-CEOs in January 2012. After years of tension, Balsillie left the company entirely, stepping down from his executive role in March 2012. Following their resignations, they were replaced by a single CEO - former co-COO Thorsten Heins. Heins hired investment banks RBC Capital Markets and JP Morgan to seek out potential buyers interested in RIM, while also redoubling efforts on releasing BlackBerry 10.

Following the assumption of role as CEO, Heins made substantial changes to the company's leadership team. Changes included the departures of Chief Technology Officer David Yach; Chief Operating Officer Jim Rowan; Senior Vice President of Software Alan Brenner; Chief Legal Officer, Karima Bawa; and Chief Information Officer Robin Bienfait.

Following the leadership changes, Heins hired Kristian Tear to assume the role of Chief Operating Officer, Frank Boulben to fill the Chief Marketing Officer role and appointed Dan Dodge, the CEO of QNX, to take over as Chief Technology Officer. On July 28, 2012, Steven E. Zipperstein was appointed as the new Vice President and Chief Legal Officer.

On March 28, 2013, Lazaridis relinquished his position as vice chairman and announced his resignation from the board of directors. Later in the year, Heins was replaced by John S. Chen, who assumed the CEO role in the first week of November. Chen's compensation package mainly consists of BlackBerry shares—a total of 13 million—and he will be entitled to the entire number of shares after he has served the company for five years. Heins received an exit package of $22 million.

Chen has a reputation as a "turnaround" CEO, turning the struggling enterprise software and services organization Sybase into enough of a success to sign a merger with SAP in 2010. Chen was open about his plans for BlackBerry upon joining the company, announcing his intent to move away from hardware manufacturing to focus on enterprise software such as QNX, BlackBerry UEM, and AtHoc.

=== Workforce reductions ===
In June 2011, RIM announced its prediction that Q1 2011 revenue would drop for the first time in nine years, and also unveiled plans to reduce its workforce.

In July 2011, the company cut 2,000 jobs, the biggest lay-off in its history and the first major layoff since November 12, 2002, when the company laid off 10% of its workforce (200 employees). The lay-off reduced the workforce by around 11%, from 19,000 employees to 17,000.

On June 28, 2012, the company announced a planned workforce reduction of 5,000 by the end of its fiscal 2013, as part of a $1 billion cost savings initiative.

On July 25, 2013, 250 employees from BlackBerry's research and development department and new product testing were laid off. The layoffs were part of the turnaround efforts.

On September 20, 2013, BlackBerry confirmed that the company will have a massive layoff of 4,500 employees by the end of 2013. This would be approximately 40 percent of the company's workforce.

BlackBerry had at its peak about 20,000 employees. After CEO John Chen joined BlackBerry in 2013 there were additional layoffs in February 2015 to compete with smartphones, at which point the total employees numbered 6,225. On July 21, 2015, BlackBerry announced an additional layoff of an unspecified number of employees, with another 200 laid off in February 2016.

As of February 2022, the company had 3,225 employees.

== Mobile OS transition ==
=== BlackBerry OS ===
The BlackBerry OS was intended to operate under much different, simpler conditions such as low powered devices, narrow network bandwidth, and high-security enterprises. However, the aging platform struggled with emerging trends like mobile web browsing, consumer applications, multimedia and touch screen interfaces. Users experienced performance issues, usability problems and instability.

The company tried to enhance the old platform, but ultimately decided to build a new platform with QNX at its core.

=== BlackBerry Tablet OS (QNX) ===
The BlackBerry PlayBook was the first RIM product whose BlackBerry Tablet OS was built on QNX, launched in April 2011 as an alternative to the Apple iPad. However, it was criticized for having incomplete software and a poor app selection. It fared poorly until prices were substantially reduced, like most other tablet computers released that year. The BlackBerry Tablet OS received a major update in February 2012, as well as numerous minor updates.

=== BlackBerry 10 (QNX) ===
BlackBerry 10, a substantially updated version of BlackBerry Tablet OS intended for the next generation BlackBerry smartphones, was originally planned for release in early 2012. The company delayed the product several times, remembering the criticism faced by the BlackBerry Playbook launch and citing the need for it to be perfect in order to stand a chance in the market. The most recent model with this OS was the BlackBerry Leap.

=== Android ===
In September 2015, BlackBerry announced the Priv, a handset running Android 5.1.1 "Lollipop". It is the first phone by the company not to run an in-house built operating system. The version of Android running on the Priv is very similar to the standard version developed by Google, with some changes to improve productivity and security. BlackBerry implemented some of the features of BlackBerry 10 within Android, such as BlackBerry Hub, BlackBerry Virtual Keyboard, BlackBerry Calendar, and BlackBerry Contacts.

On July 26, 2016, a mid-range model with only an on-screen keyboard was introduced, the slim BlackBerry DTEK50, powered by the then-latest version of Android (6.0, Marshmallow) and featuring a 5.2-inch full high-definition display. BlackBerry chief security officer David Kleidermacher stressed data security during the launch, indicating that this model included built-in malware protection and encryption of all user information. By then, the BlackBerry Classic, which used the BlackBerry 10 OS, had been discontinued.

In July 2016, industry observers expected the company to announce two additional smartphones over the subsequent 12 months, presumably also with the Android OS. However, BlackBerry COO Marty Beard told Bloomberg that "The company's never said that we would not build another BB10 device."

In 2018, the last Blackberry smartphone, the BlackBerry Key2 LE, was released. In 2022, BlackBerry discontinued support for BlackBerry 10, effectively ending their presence in the smartphone market.

== Acquisitions ==
Through the years, particularly as the company moved towards cybersecurity, BlackBerry has made numerous acquisitions of third-party companies and technology.

=== Slipstream Data Inc. ===
Slipstream Data Inc was a network optimization/data compression/network acceleration software company. BlackBerry acquired the company as a wholly owned subsidiary on July 11, 2006. The company continues to operate out of Waterloo.

=== Certicom ===
Certicom Corp. is a cryptography company founded in 1985 by Gordon Agnew, Ron Mullin and Scott Vanstone.

The Certicom intellectual property portfolio includes over 350 patents and patents pending worldwide that cover key aspects of elliptic-curve cryptography (ECC).

The National Security Agency (NSA) has licensed 26 of Certicom's ECC patents as a way of clearing the way for the implementation of elliptic curves to protect U.S. and allied government information.

On January 23, 2009, VeriSign entered into an agreement to acquire Certicom. Research In Motion put in a counter-offer, which was deemed superior. VeriSign did not match this offer, and so Certicom announced an agreement to be acquired by RIM. Upon the completion of this transaction, Certicom became a wholly owned subsidiary of RIM, and was de-listed from the Toronto Stock Exchange on March 25, 2009.

=== Dash Navigation ===
In June 2009, RIM announced they would acquire Dash Navigation, makers of the Dash Express.

=== Torch Mobile ===
In August 2009, RIM acquired Torch Mobile, developer of Iris Browser, enabling the inclusion of a WebKit-based browser on their BlackBerry devices, which became the web browser in subsequent Java-based operating systems (BlackBerry 6, BlackBerry 7) and operating systems (QNX based BlackBerry Tablet OS and BlackBerry 10). The first product to contain this browser, the BlackBerry Torch 9800, was named after the company.

=== DataViz ===
On September 8, 2010, DataViz, Inc. sold their office suite Documents To Go and other assets to Research In Motion for $50 million. Subsequently, the application which allows users to view and edit Microsoft Word, Microsoft Excel and Microsoft PowerPoint was bundled on BlackBerry Smartphones and tablets.

=== Viigo ===
On March 26, 2010, the company announced its acquisition of Viigo, a Toronto-based company that developed the popular Viigo for BlackBerry applications, which aggregated news content from around the web. Terms of the deal were not disclosed.

=== QNX ===
RIM reached an agreement with Harman International on April 12, 2010, for RIM to acquire QNX Software Systems. The acquired company was to serve as the foundation for the next generation BlackBerry platform that crossed devices. QNX became the platform for the BlackBerry PlayBook and BlackBerry 10 Smartphones.

=== The Astonishing Tribe ===
The Astonishing Tribe (TAT), a user interface design company based in Malmö, Sweden, was acquired by RIM on December 2, 2010. With a history of creating user interfaces and applications for mobile, TAT contributed heavily to the user experience of BlackBerry 10 as well as the development of its GUI framework, Cascades.

=== JayCut ===
In July 2011, RIM brought on JayCut, a Sweden-based company that is an online video editor. JayCut technology was incorporated into the media software of BlackBerry 10.

=== Paratek Microwave ===
In March 2012, RIM acquired Paratek Microwave, bringing their adaptive RF Tuning technology into BlackBerry handsets.

=== Tungle.me ===
On September 18, 2012, it was announced that the RIM social calendaring service, Tungle.me would be shut down on December 3, 2012. RIM acquired Tungle.me in April 2011.

=== Newbay ===
In July 2011, RIM acquired NewBay, an Irish-based company that is an online video, pics and tool for media networks editor. RIM subsequently sold NewBay to Synchronoss in December 2012 for $55.5 million.

=== Scoreloop ===
On June 7, 2011, Scoreloop was acquired by BlackBerry for US$71 million. It provided tools for adding social elements to any game (achievements/rewards etc.) and was central to the BlackBerry 10's Games app. On December 1, 2014, all Scoreloop services were shut down.

=== Gist ===
Gist was acquired in February 2011, by BlackBerry. Gist was a tool that helps users to organise and view all their contacts in one place. Gist's services closed down on September 15, 2012, in order for the company to focus on BlackBerry 10.

=== Scroon ===
BlackBerry Ltd. acquired Scroon in May 2013. The French startup manages Facebook, Twitter and other social-media accounts for large clients like luxury-good maker LVMH Moet Hennessy Louis Vuitton SA, wireless operator Orange SA (ORA) and Warner Bros. Entertainment. The deal was publicly announced in November 2013. According to Scroon founder, Alexandre Mars, he had not disclosed the purchase by BlackBerry before because of the "delicate media buzz" around the company. Scroon is part of BlackBerry's strategy to profit from the BlackBerry Messenger instant-messaging service by utilizing the newly unveiled BBM Channels. Financial terms were not disclosed.

=== Movirtu ===
Movirtu was acquired in September 2014, by BlackBerry. Movirtu is a U.K. startup that allows multiple phone numbers to be active on a single mobile device. At the time of the acquisition BlackBerry announced they would expand this functionality beyond BlackBerry 10 to other mobile platforms such as Android and iOS.

=== Secusmart ===
Secusmart was acquired in September 2014. The German-based company was one of the steps to position BlackBerry as the most secure provider in the mobile market. Secusmart had the agreement to equip the German Government with high secure mobile devices that encrypt voice as well as data on BlackBerry 10 devices. Those phones are currently in use by Angela Merkel and most of the ministers as well as several Departments and the Parliament.

=== WatchDox ===
WatchDox was an Israel-based Enterprise File Synchronization and Sharing company which specialized in securing access to documents on a cloud basis. BlackBerry acquired the company in April 2015. On December 8, 2016, BlackBerry renamed WatchDox to BlackBerry Workspaces.

In August 2019, BlackBerry closed down its Israel development center.

=== AtHoc ===
On July 22, 2015, BlackBerry announced that it had acquired AtHoc, a provider of secure, networked emergency communications.

=== Good Technology ===
On September 4, 2015, BlackBerry announced the acquisition of mobile security provider Good Technology for $425 million. On December 8, 2016, it rebranded Good's products and integrated them into the BlackBerry Enterprise Mobility Suite, a set of tiered software offerings for its enterprise customers.

=== Encription ===
On February 24, 2016, BlackBerry acquired UK-based cyber security consultancy Encription.

=== Cylance ===
On November 16, 2018, Cylance was purchased for US$1.4 billion by BlackBerry Limited in an all cash deal. The technology behind Cylance would enable BlackBerry to add artificial intelligence capabilities to its existing software products for IoT applications and other services. Cylance ran as a separate division within BlackBerry Limited's operations.

On December 16, 2024, it was announced that BlackBerry sold Cylance to Arctic Wolf for US$160 million.

== Software ==
=== BlackBerry Unified Endpoint Manager (UEM) ===
An Enterprise Mobility Management platform that provides provisional and access control over smartphones, tablets, laptops, and desktops with support for all major platforms including iOS, Android (including Android for Work and Samsung KNOX), BlackBerry 10, Windows 10, and Mac OS. UEM (formerly known as BES) also acts as a unified management console and server for BlackBerry Dynamics, BlackBerry Workspaces, and BlackBerry 2FA.

=== BlackBerry Dynamics (Formerly Good Dynamics) ===
A Mobile Application Management platform that manages and secures app data through application virtualization. The BlackBerry Dynamics suite of apps includes email, calendar, contacts, tasks, instant messaging, browsing, and document sharing. The BlackBerry Dynamics SDK allows developers to utilize the platform's security, and add functionality from BlackBerry's other solutions into their applications.

=== BlackBerry Workspaces (Formerly WatchDox) ===
An Enterprise File Synchronization and Sharing (EFSS) platform, Workspaces provides file-level digital rights management controls alongside file synchronization and sharing functionality.

=== BlackBerry 2FA (Formerly Strong Authentication) ===
A two-factor, certificate-based VPN authentication solution that allows users to authenticate without requiring PINs or passwords.

=== BBM Enterprise ===
An IP-based enterprise instant messaging platform that provides end-to-end encryption for voice, video, and text-based communication. On February 7, 2017, Blackberry released the BBM Enterprise SDK, a "Communications Platform as a Service" kit that allows developers to incorporate BBM Enterprise's messaging capabilities into their own applications. Said capabilities include secure messaging, voice, video, file sharing, and presence information.

=== BlackBerry AtHoc ===
An emergency communication system, AtHoc provides two-way messaging and notifications across a range of devices and platforms. On May 17, 2017, BlackBerry released AtHoc Account to help businesses more easily keep track of their staff in an emergency.

==== SecuSUITE ====
An anti-eavesdropping solution that provides voice, data, and SMS encryption.

=== BlackBerry QNX ===
A real-time embedded operating system, QNX drives multiple software systems in modern auto vehicles, and forms the basis of solutions like BlackBerry Radar, an IoT-based asset tracking system for the transportation industry.

=== BlackBerry IVY ===
BlackBerry IVY is an edge-to-cloud vehicle data platform.

== Patent litigation ==
Since the turn of the century, RIM has been embroiled in a series of suits relating to alleged patent infringement.

=== Glenayre Electronics ===
In 2001, Research In Motion sued competitor Glenayre Electronics Inc. for patent infringement, partly in response to an earlier infringement suit filed by Glenayre against RIM. RIM sought an injunction to prevent Glenayre from infringing on RIM's "Single Mailbox Integration" patent. The suit was ultimately settled in favour of RIM.

=== Good Technology ===
In June 2002, Research In Motion filed suit against 2000 start-up and competitor Good Technology. RIM filed additional complaints throughout the year. In March 2004, Good agreed to a licensing deal, thereby settling the outstanding litigation.

=== Handspring ===
On September 16, 2002, Research In Motion was awarded a patent pertaining to keyboard design on hand-held e-mail devices. Upon receiving the patent, it proceeded to sue Handspring over its Treo device. Handspring eventually agreed to license RIM's patent and avoid further litigation in November of the same year.

=== NTP ===
During the appeals, RIM discovered new prior art that raised a "substantial new question of patentability" and filed for a reexamination of the NTP patents in the United States Patent and Trademark Office. That reexamination was conducted separately to the court cases for infringement. In February 2006, the USPTO rejected all of NTP's claims in three disputed patents. NTP appealed the decision, and the reexamination process was still ongoing as of July 2006 (See NTP, Inc. for details).

On March 3, 2006, RIM announced that it had settled its BlackBerry patent dispute with NTP. Under the terms of the settlement, RIM agreed to pay NTP US$612.5 million in a "full and final settlement of all claims". In a statement, RIM said that "all terms of the agreement have been finalized and the litigation against RIM has been dismissed by a court order this afternoon. The agreement eliminates the need for any further court proceedings or decisions relating to damages or injunctive relief."

=== Xerox ===
On July 17, 2003, while still embroiled in litigation with NTP and Good Technology, RIM filed suit against Xerox in the U.S. District of Hartford, Connecticut. The suit was filed in response to discussions about patents held by Xerox that might affect RIM's business and also asked that patents held by Xerox be invalidated.

=== Visto ===
On May 1, 2006, RIM was sued by Visto for infringement of four patents. Though the patents were widely considered invalid and in the same veins as the NTP patents – with a judgement going against Visto in the U.K. – RIM settled the lawsuit in the United States on July 16, 2009, with RIM agreeing to pay Visto US$267.5 million plus other undisclosed terms.

=== Motorola ===
On January 22, 2010, Motorola requested that all BlackBerry smartphones be banned from being imported into the United States for infringing upon five of Motorola's patents. Their patents for "early-stage innovations", including UI, power management and WiFi, are in question. RIM countersued later the same day, alleging anti-competitive behaviour and that Motorola had broken a 2003 licensing agreement by refusing to extend licensing terms beyond 2008. The companies settled out of court on June 11, 2010.

=== Eatoni ===
On December 5, 2011, Research In Motion obtained an order granting its motion to dismiss plaintiff Eatoni's claims that RIM violated Section 2 of the Sherman Antitrust Act and equivalent portions of New York's Donnelly Act. Eatoni alleged that RIM's alleged infringement of plaintiff's '317 patent constituted an antitrust violation. Eatoni Ergonomics, Inc. v. Research In Motion Corp., No. 08-Civ. 10079 (WHP) (S.D.N.Y. Dec 5, 2011), Memorandum and Order, p. 1 (Pauley, J.).

=== Mformation ===
In July 2012, a U.S. federal court jury awarded damages (later overturned) of $147 million against Research In Motion. The jury decided that Research In Motion had violated patents of Mformation and calculated damages of $8 each on 18.4 million units for royalties on past sales of devices to nongovernment U.S. customers only, not including future royalty payments inside and outside the U.S. On August 9, 2012, that verdict was overturned on appeal. RIM had argued that Mformation's patent claims were invalid because the processes were already being used when Mformation filed its patent application. Judge James Ware said Mformation failed to establish that RIM had infringed on the company's patent.

=== Qualcomm ===
On May 26, 2017, BlackBerry announced that it had reached an agreement with Qualcomm Incorporated resolving all amounts payable in connection with the interim arbitration decision announced on April 12, 2017. Following a joint stipulation by the parties, the arbitration panel has issued a final award providing for the payment by Qualcomm to BlackBerry of a total amount of U.S.$940,000,000 including interest and attorneys' fees, net of certain royalties due from BlackBerry for calendar 2016 and the first quarter of calendar 2017.

=== Facebook ===
On March 8, 2018, BlackBerry Limited sued Facebook Inc. in federal court in Los Angeles. According to BlackBerry Limited, Facebook has built swaths of its empire on the messaging technology which was originally developed by them during the time when the Facebook chief, Mark Zuckerberg, was still living in a Harvard University dorm room. Blackberry Limited alleged that many features of the Facebook messaging service infringe on BlackBerry patents. In January 2021, BlackBerry shares jumped 20% after settling its patent dispute with Facebook.

== Controversies ==
=== Environmental record ===
In November 2011, Blackberry, then RIM, was ranked 15th out of 15 electronics manufacturers in Greenpeace's re-launched Guide to Greener Electronics. In its 2012 report on progress relating to conflict minerals, the Enough Project rated RIM the sixth highest of 24 consumer electronics companies. In 2014, RIM partnered with Solutions for Hope to expand the number of conflict-free mineral regions in the Congo.

=== Service outages ===
On October 10, 2011, RIM experienced one of the worst service outages in the company's history. Tens of millions of BlackBerry users in Europe, the Middle East, Africa, and North America were unable to receive or send emails and BBM messages through their phones. The outage was caused as a result of a core switch failure, "A transition to a back-up switch did not function as tested, causing a large backlog of data, RIM said." Service was restored on October 13, with RIM announcing a $100 package of free premium apps for users and enterprise support extensions.

=== Government access to encrypted communication ===
After a four-year stand-off with the Indian government over access to RIM's secure networks, the company demonstrated the ability to intercept consumer email and messaging traffic between BlackBerry handsets, and make these encrypted communications available to Indian security agencies. This agreement does not include its enterprise services.

Through the Canadian Mutual Legal Assistance in Criminal Matters Act, Blackberry has given its master encryption keys to law enforcement, allowing the Royal Canadian Mounted Police to view communications and other encrypted information. Then-CEO John Chen defended the company's sharing of data, saying "(we) have long been clear in our stance that tech companies as good corporate citizens should comply with reasonable lawful access requests."

== See also ==
- BlackBerry – Discontinued line of mobile devices and services
- BlackBerry Mobile – Brand of mobility devices
- Index of articles related to BlackBerry OS
- List of BlackBerry products
- List of mergers and acquisitions by BlackBerry
- List of mobile phone brands by country
- List of multinational corporations
- Science and technology in Canada
