= Jérôme Béglé =

French journalist

- Born: 3 May 1971
- Position held: director general (2022–2023)

Jérôme Béglé (born 1971) is a French journalist.

He has been a journalist at Paris Match since 1997. He became deputy editor-in-chief of Le Figaro Magazine in 2009, then editor-in-chief of Le Point's website from 2012 to 2014, before becoming its deputy editor-in-chief.

In 2022, he became the managing director of the editorial board of Le Journal du Dimanche (JDD), before becoming managing director of the editorial board of Paris Match in 2023.

In 2024, following the acquisition of Paris Match by the LVMH group, he was also promoted to editor-in-chief of the newspaper.

== Biography ==
=== Journalism ===
Jérôme Béglé is a graduate of the French Press Institute.

During the 1990s, he was a presenter on Radio Notre Dame and a weekly columnist for Le Figaro littéraire.

In 1996, as part of his military service, he traveled to Sarajevo to be a presenter on Azur FM, a radio station aimed at boosting the morale of French soldiers in the United Nations Protection Force. He joined Paris Match the same year, for whom he worked for about a decade. During this time, he was known for his extensive network and Parisian evening gatherings.

He later became deputy editor-in-chief of Le Figaro Magazine from 2009 to 2010, and then at Le Point from 2014 to 2022.

In 2016, his potential appointment as the head of Le Journal du Dimanche sparked opposition among the journalists at the weekly magazine. Tensions within the JDD surfaced amidst a decline in circulation and restructurings at the Lagardère Group, owner of the publication. Despite concerns within the editorial staff, he eventually became the managing director of the newspaper in 2022.

From 2017 to 2024, he was a regular participant on Pascal Praud's show L'Heure des pros on CNews.

In 2023, he was appointed managing director of the editorial board at Paris Match, and in 2024, he became the editor-in-chief of the magazine following its acquisition by the LVMH group.

== Literary activities ==
Close to Jean-Edern Hallier, he was one of his reading assistants when Hallier lost his sight and appeared on Paris Première in his show Le Jean-Edern's Club.

From 2013 to 2019, he gave a column to Gabriel Matzneff in Le Point, which was interrupted upon the announcement of Vanessa Springora's book The Consent.

== Controversies ==
Béglé was suspected of plagiarism by a journalist from L'Express in 2008 and again in 2012 after reproducing an article from a blogger.

On June 30, 2014, Le Point published an article by Jérôme Béglé that was quickly picked up by other national press outlets, claiming that "a porn film had been shot at Asnières Town Hall." However, it was revealed that the images in question were from a montage and that the "torrid scenes" described by the newspaper had not been filmed in the town hall. Jérôme Béglé, the author of the article and editor-in-chief at Le Point, along with his colleague Étienne Gernelle, were condemned after being taken to court by the former Socialist mayor of Asnières, Sébastien Pietrasanta. The incriminated article remained online without modification. Furthermore, according to Mediapart, "the condemnations in the false Asnières 'porno film' case occur within a specific context" because Jérôme Béglé is friends with the city's right-wing opposition leader, Manuel Aeschlimann, who was the source of this false information. The justice system noted that "the journalist not only took Manuel Aeschlimann's accusations at face value, without verifying them and without first obtaining the view of the plaintiff but also supplemented them with malicious comments or expressions."
