= Results of the 2024 French legislative election in Hauts-de-Seine =

Following the first round of the 2024 French legislative election on 30 June 2024, runoff elections in each constituency where no candidate received a vote share greater than 50 percent were scheduled for 7 July. Candidates permitted to stand in the runoff elections needed to either come in first or second place in the first round or achieve more than 12.5 percent of the votes of the entire electorate (as opposed to 12.5 percent of the vote share due to low turnout).

== Hauts-de-Seine ==
=== 1st constituency ===
Candidate	Party or alliance		Votes	%
Elsa Faucillon	New Popular Front	Communist Party	26,225	64.83
Mariam Camara	National Rally		5,464	13.51
Frédéric Sarkis	Ensemble	Renaissance	5,369	13.27
Diane De Longueville	The Republicans		1,752	4.33
Nicolas Fegeant	Union of Democrats and Independents (Note: Dissident who ran without the support of Ensemble)		596	1.47
Zina Bounab	Far-left	Lutte Ouvrière	368	0.91
Marie-Laure Decaillet	Reconquête		346	0.86
Armelle Pertus	Far-left	New Anticapitalist Party (Note: Dissident who ran without the support of the New Popular Front)	218	0.54
Marine Massonneau	Miscellaneous centre	Independent	117	0.29
Total			40,455	100.00
Valid votes			40,455	97.57
Invalid votes			177	0.43
Blank votes			831	2.00
Total votes			41,463	100.00
Registered voters/turnout			67,718	61.23

=== 2nd constituency ===
Candidate	Party or alliance		First round		Second round	
Candidate	Party or alliance		Votes	%	Votes	%
Thomas Lam	The Republicans		21,760	41.59	27,036	54.84
Francesca Pasquini	New Popular Front	The Ecologists	20,683	39.53	22,264	45.16
Anne-Caroline Gallimard	Union of the far right	The Republicans	6,817	13.03		
Sébastien Phan	Miscellaneous centre	Independent	1,188	2.27		
Julia Pettitt	Reconquête		637	1.22		
Ahmed Lakrafi	Miscellaneous centre	Independent	564	1.08		
Julien Puertas	Far-left	Lutte Ouvrière	360	0.69		
Louis Duroulle	Miscellaneous centre	Independent	317	0.61		
Total			52,326	100.00	49,300	100.00
Valid votes			52,326	98.19	49,300	97.11
Invalid votes			186	0.35	262	0.52
Blank votes			777	1.46	1,206	2.38
Total votes			53,289	100.00	50,768	100.00
Registered voters/turnout			71,691	74.33	71,712	70.79

=== 3rd constituency ===
Candidate	Party or alliance		Votes	%
Philippe Juvin	The Republicans		31,109	52.09
Isabelle Dahan	New Popular Front	Socialist Party	18,774	31.44
Carole Roussel	National Rally		8,478	14.20
Marc Gerard	Reconquête		992	1.66
Aline Fradin	Far-left	Lutte Ouvrière	364	0.61
Total			59,717	100.00
Valid votes			59,717	98.35
Invalid votes			107	0.18
Blank votes			897	1.48
Total votes			60,721	100.00
Registered voters/turnout			83,095	73.07

=== 4th constituency ===
Candidate	Party or alliance		First round		Second round	
Candidate	Party or alliance		Votes	%	Votes	%
Sabrina Sebaihi	New Popular Front	The Ecologists	26,373	49.13	28,034	57.99
Isabelle De Crecy	Ensemble	Horizons	15,899	29.62	20,309	42.01
Mélina Bravo	National Rally		8,185	15.25		
Aurélie Vonsy	Ecologists		1,086	2.02		
Régis Valette	Reconquête		758	1.41		
Laurent Strumanne	Far-left	Lutte Ouvrière	425	0.79		
Mathilde Eisenberg	Far-left	New Anticapitalist Party (Note: Dissident who ran without the support of the New Popular Front)	391	0.73		
Valéry Barny	Miscellaneous left	Independent	297	0.55		
Sean Phillip Mc Coy	Miscellaneous left	Independent	263	0.49		
Total			53,677	100.00	48,343	100.00
Valid votes			53,677	97.80	48,343	95.03
Invalid votes			204	0.37	358	0.70
Blank votes			1,002	1.83	2,170	4.27
Total votes			54,883	100.00	50,871	100.00
Registered voters/turnout			81,078	67.69	81,091	62.73

=== 5th constituency ===
Candidate	Party or alliance		First round		Second round	
Candidate	Party or alliance		Votes	%	Votes	%
Raphaël Pitti	New Popular Front	Miscellaneous left	19,939	36.54	21,676	43.95
Céline Calvez	Ensemble	Renaissance	17,255	31.62	27,642	56.05
Amélie Pinçon	Union of the far right	The Republicans	7,869	14.42		
Sophie Deschiens	The Republicans		6,935	12.71		
Hayat Bakhti	Union of Democrats and Independents (Note: Dissident who ran without the support of Ensemble)		891	1.63		
Josette Botet	Reconquête		571	1.05		
Benjamin Dewhurst	Independent		542	0.99		
Mireille Lambert	Far-left	Lutte Ouvrière	343	0.63		
Alexandra Riu	Miscellaneous centre	Independent	227	0.42		
Total			54,572	100.00	49,318	100.00
Valid votes			54,572	98.81	49,318	95.02
Invalid votes			232	0.42	735	1.42
Blank votes			423	0.77	1,850	3.56
Total votes			55,227	100.00	51,903	100.00
Registered voters/turnout			77,488	71.27	77,514	66.96

=== 6th constituency ===
Candidate	Party or alliance		First round		Second round	
Candidate	Party or alliance		Votes	%	Votes	%
Constance Le Grip	Ensemble	Renaissance	22,627	40.14	22,960	45.02
Geoffroy Didier	The Republicans		11,217	19.90	17,802	34.90
Sihame Muscianisi	New Popular Front	La France Insoumise	10,857	19.26	10,241	20.08
Alexis Pany	Union of the far right	The Republicans	9,512	16.88		
Jean Messiha	Reconquête		1,776	3.15		
Françoise Marcel	Far-left	Lutte Ouvrière	352	0.62		
François-Xavier Deroche	Miscellaneous centre	Independent	25	0.04		
Total			56,366	100.00	51,003	100.00
Valid votes			56,366	98.50	51,003	97.18
Invalid votes			156	0.27	308	0.59
Blank votes			702	1.23	1,170	2.23
Total votes			57,224	100.00	52,481	100.00
Registered voters/turnout			76,447	74.85	76,451	68.65

=== 7th constituency ===
Candidate	Party or alliance		Votes	%
Pierre Cazeneuve	Ensemble	Renaissance	34,053	53.20
Lucas Peyret	New Popular Front	La France Insoumise	14,749	23.04
Christine Pastor	National Rally		12,057	18.84
Charlotte Richard	Ecologists	Independent	1,633	2.55
Rémi Carillon	Reconquête		1,083	1.69
Cécile Abad	Far-left	Lutte Ouvrière	431	0.67
Total			64,006	100.00
Valid votes			64,006	97.71
Invalid votes			304	0.46
Blank votes			1,198	1.83
Total votes			65,508	100.00
Registered voters/turnout			88,339	74.16

=== 8th constituency ===
Candidate	Party or alliance		First round		Second round	
Candidate	Party or alliance		Votes	%	Votes	%
Prisca Thevenot	Ensemble	Renaissance	20,274	39.91	27,453	62.44
Salomé Nicolas-Chavance	New Popular Front	Socialist Party	15,392	30.30	16,516	37.56
Delphine Veissière	National Rally		7,979	15.71		
Cécile Richez	The Republicans		4,959	9.76		
Miron Cusa	Miscellaneous left	Ecologists	968	1.91		
Adélaïde Motte	Reconquête		626	1.23		
Adam Brahimi-Semper	Ecologists	Independent	350	0.69		
Philippe Hénique	Far-left	Lutte Ouvrière	196	0.39		
Jean-Baptiste Layly	Independent		49	0.10		
Total			50,793	100.00	43,969	100.00
Valid votes			50,793	98.44	43,969	92.51
Invalid votes			117	0.23	517	1.09
Blank votes			687	1.33	3,041	6.40
Total votes			51,597	100.00	47,527	100.00
Registered voters/turnout			68,205	75.65	68,222	69.67

=== 9th constituency ===
Candidate	Party or alliance		First round		Second round	
Candidate	Party or alliance		Votes	%	Votes	%
Stéphane Séjourné	Ensemble	Renaissance	21,593	46.07	27,978	72.63
Pauline Rapilly-Ferniot	New Popular Front	The Ecologists	10,024	21.39	10,543	27.37
Virginie Mathot	The Republicans		7,108	15.17		
Julia Carrasco	National Rally		6,528	13.93		
Joseph Samoun	Reconquête		840	1.79		
Hazrije Mustafic	Miscellaneous centre	Independent	459	0.98		
Anne-Laure Chaudon	Far-left	Lutte Ouvrière	225	0.48		
Thierry Narboni	Miscellaneous right	Independent	92	0.20		
Total			46,869	100.00	38,521	100.00
Valid votes			46,869	98.33	38,521	92.08
Invalid votes			0	0.00	0	0.00
Blank votes			796	1.67	3,314	7.92
Total votes			47,665	100.00	41,835	100.00
Registered voters/turnout			63,463	75.11	63,476	65.91

=== 10th constituency ===
Candidate	Party or alliance		First round		Second round	
Candidate	Party or alliance		Votes	%	Votes	%
Gabriel Attal	Ensemble	Renaissance	25,675	43.85	29,924	58.23
Cécile Soubelet	New Popular Front	Socialist Party	20,806	35.53	21,466	41.77
Sébastien Laye	Union of the far right	The Republicans	7,732	13.21		
Clément Perrin	The Republicans		2,972	5.08		
Herlander Ferreira Do Amaral	Reconquête		766	1.31		
Laurence Viguié	Far-left	Lutte Ouvrière	315	0.54		
Béatrice Guillemet	Miscellaneous left	Independent	150	0.26		
Nicolas Lemesle	Independent		109	0.19		
Esteban Ygouf	Miscellaneous left	Independent	28	0.05		
Total			58,553	100.00	51,390	100.00
Valid votes			58,553	98.14	51,390	93.35
Invalid votes			76	0.13	299	0.54
Blank votes			1,034	1.73	3,359	6.10
Total votes			59,663	100.00	55,048	100.00
Registered voters/turnout			80,243	74.35	80,263	68.58

=== 11th constituency ===
Candidate	Party or alliance		Votes	%
Aurélien Saintoul	New Popular Front	La France Insoumise	25,031	50.14
Laurianne Rossi	Ensemble	Renaissance	15,036	30.12
Juliette Chatelain	National Rally		6,737	13.49
Eric Roux	Miscellaneous centre	Independent	1,039	2.08
Renaud Couzin	Ecologists	Independent	797	1.60
Suzanne Baclet	Reconquête		491	0.98
Franck Rollot	Far-left	Lutte Ouvrière	281	0.56
Olivier Gardent	Miscellaneous left	Independent	196	0.39
Xavier Chiarelli	Far-left	New Anticapitalist Party (Note: Dissident who ran without the support of the New Popular Front)	161	0.32
Philippe Ponge	Miscellaneous left	Independent	154	0.31
Total			49,923	100.00
Valid votes			49,923	98.12
Invalid votes			312	0.61
Blank votes			647	1.27
Total votes			50,882	100.00
Registered voters/turnout			71,659	71.01

=== 12th constituency ===
Candidate	Party or alliance		First round		Second round	
Candidate	Party or alliance		Votes	%	Votes	%
Jean-Didier Berger	The Republicans		26,790	39.43	34,455	54.31
Lounes Adjroud	New Popular Front	Socialist Party	26,034	38.32	28,985	45.69
Christophe Versini	National Rally		11,710	17.24		
Stéphane Legrand	Ecologists	Independent	1,762	2.59		
Philippe Houplain	Reconquête		736	1.08		
Guillaume Chinan	Miscellaneous left	Independent	444	0.65		
Yann Bernard	Far-left	Lutte Ouvrière	444	0.65		
Assma Benharkat	Miscellaneous left	Independent	23	0.03		
Total			67,943	100.00	63,440	100.00
Valid votes			67,943	98.28	63,440	96.05
Invalid votes			359	0.52	703	1.06
Blank votes			827	1.20	1,909	2.89
Total votes			69,129	100.00	66,052	100.00
Registered voters/turnout			93,823	73.68	93,833	70.39

=== 13th constituency ===
Candidate	Party or alliance		First round		Second round	
Candidate	Party or alliance		Votes	%	Votes	%
Maud Bregeon	Ensemble	Renaissance	25,721	39.18	33,310	56.12
Brice Gaillard	New Popular Front	Socialist Party	24,798	37.77	26,044	43.88
Patrick Yvars	National Rally		9,629	14.67		
Numa Isnard	The Republicans		3,613	5.50		
Marie-Josée Preto	Reconquête		770	1.17		
Mohamed Tounsi	Miscellaneous centre	Independent	736	1.12		
Agathe Martin	Far-left	Lutte Ouvrière	385	0.59		
Total			65,652	100.00	59,354	100.00
Valid votes			65,652	98.00	59,354	94.31
Invalid votes			87	0.13	241	0.38
Blank votes			1,251	1.87	3,339	5.31
Total votes			66,990	100.00	62,934	100.00
Registered voters/turnout			89,338	74.98	89,348	70.44
