= Carrefour Argentina =

Retail in Argentina

INC S.A.

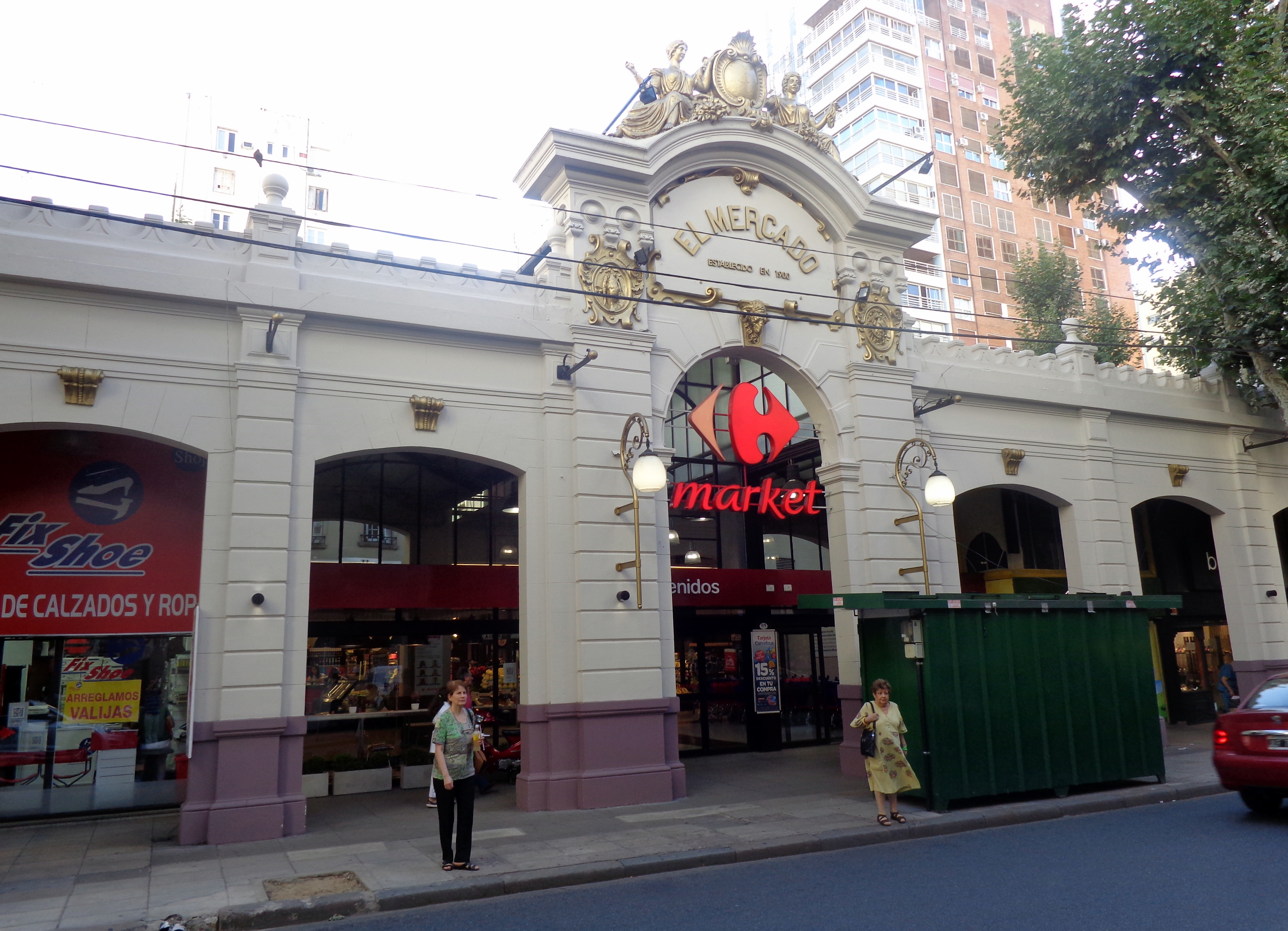
- Carrefour Market located in Recoleta, Buenos Aires.
- Trade name: Carrefour Argentina
- Type: Private
- Industry: Retail; Wholesaling
- Founded: 1982; 44 years ago
- Headquarters: Cuyo 3367, Buenos Aires Province, Argentina
- Area served: Argentina
- Key people: David Collas (CEO)
- Services: Cash and carry, warehouse club, discount store, hypermarket, supercenter, superstore, supermarket
- Number of employees: +18.000
- Website: carrefour.com.ar

Carrefour Argentina is a retail hypermarket and supermarket chain in Argentina, originally from France and a subsidiary of the Carrefour Group. It currently has more than 650 stores under the Carrefour, Market, Express, and Maxi formats, spread across 22 provinces.

== History ==
Carrefour arrived in Argentina in 1982, the year it opened its first hypermarket in San Isidro, Buenos Aires province. Over the years, the chain expanded and diversified, including formats such as Market and Express, in addition to traditional hypermarkets.

In figures, 1.25 billion pesos invested during the 2006-2009 period, more than 20,000 employees nationwide, 11.6 billion pesos invoiced during 2009, and nearly 4,400 active suppliers are numbers that demonstrate the growth of the Carrefour Group in Argentina. In 2001, Carrefour acquired the Supermercados Norte chain in Argentina. Thus, it doubled its size and became the retailer with the largest reach nationwide.

Between 2006 and 2009, Carrefour Argentina launched a store expansion plan with an investment of more than 1.25 billion pesos. In total, 45 new stores were opened and another 117 were reopened under the Carrefour brand.

Today, Carrefour is a pillar of Argentine retail, with more than 650 stores spread across 22 provinces, encompassing a variety of formats that meet the needs of its customers. The company is consolidating its position as one of the largest private employers in the country.

== Possible sale in 2025 ==
In July 2025, Carrefour began the process of selling its operations in Argentina. The group selected Deutsche Bank to analyze its assets in the country and prepare a list of candidates.

On February 19, 2026, the global CEO of Carrefour Group, Alexandre Bompard, confirmed that the offers received did not meet expectations and the sale was cancelled; the company will continue its operations in the country.

== Other websites ==
- Official website
