= Lycée Alexandre Dumas (Saint-Cloud) =

French high school in St-Cloud, France

Lycée Alexandre-Dumas
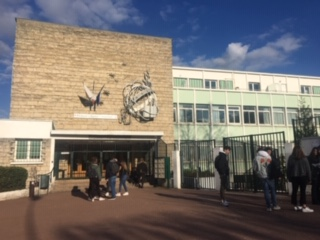
- 112 Boulevard de la République; 92210 Saint-Cloud; France

Information
- Type: Public
- Established: 1936
- Principal: Frédéric Lenfantin

Lycée Alexandre Dumas is a senior high school/sixth-form college in Saint-Cloud, Hauts-de-Seine, France, in the Paris metropolitan area.

It was previously named Lycée Florent-Schmitt but in 1996 a musical philosophy teacher from the school discovered pamphlets dating from the 1930s in which the namesake, Florent Schmitt, denounced German Jews and Israelite (Jewish) influence on music. Afterward there had been multiple attempts to change the school's name.

It was renamed in honor of Alexandre Dumas in 2003.

== Notable alumni ==
- Jean Jolivet (1925 - 2018), French philosopher and medievalist
- Yves Calvi (1959-), French journalist and television presenter
- Éric Naulleau (1961-), French literary critic, editor, essayist and columnist
- Marine Le Pen (1968-), French lawyer and politician
- Marion Maréchal (1989-), French politician
- Alexandre Mars (1974-), French entrepreneur, philanthropist and author
- Caroline Mécary (1963-), French lawyer
- Adrien Taquet (1977), French politician
- Isabelle Huppert (1953), French actress
