= List of mergers and acquisitions by BlackBerry =

BlackBerry Limited, formerly Research in Motion (RIM), is a Canadian multinational communications corporation, founded in 1995. It is headquartered in Waterloo, Ontario.

== Acquisitions ==
	Date	Company	Business	Country	Value (USD)	Adjusted (USD)	References
1	16 November 2001	Plazmic Inc.	Software	Canada	Undisclosed	Undisclosed	
2	7 August 2002	TeamOn Systems Inc.	Software provider	United States	Undisclosed	Undisclosed	
3	22 February 2005	Nextair Inc.	Mobile app design studio and apps	Canada	Undisclosed	Undisclosed	
4	10 March 2006	Ascendent Systems	Enterprise voice mobility solutions	United States	Undisclosed	Undisclosed	
5	10 June 2006	Slipstream Data Inc.	Data compression	Canada	Undisclosed	Undisclosed	
6	22 November 2006	Epoch Integration	Wireless network firm	Canada	Undisclosed	Undisclosed	
7	23 January 2009	Certicom	Cryptography	Canada	Undisclosed	Undisclosed	
8	30 January 2009	Chalk Media	Software	Canada	$23,125,000	$35,000,000	
9	13 February 2009	Alt-N Technologies	Mail transfer agent	United States	Undisclosed	Undisclosed	
10	5 June 2009	Dash Navigation	Car navigation systems	United States	Undisclosed	Undisclosed	
11	24 August 2009	Torch Mobile	WebKit mobile browser	Canada	Undisclosed	Undisclosed	
12	26 March 2010	Viigo	News / data aggregation	Canada	Undisclosed	Undisclosed	
13	9 April 2010	QNX Software Systems	Unix-like OS	Canada	$200 million	295.3	
14	24 August 2010	Cellmania	App store software maker	United States	Undisclosed	Undisclosed	
15	8 September 2010	Documents To Go and other assets	Office suite	United States	$50 million	73.8	
16	2 December 2010	The Astonishing Tribe	Interface wizards	Sweden	$150 million	221.5	
17	14 February 2011	Gist	Professional contact manager	United States	Undisclosed	Undisclosed	
18	25 March 2011	tinyHippos	Mobile web development	Canada	Undisclosed	Undisclosed	
19	27 April 2011	Tungle.me	Social calendaring	Canada	Undisclosed	Undisclosed	
20	7 June 2011	Scoreloop	Social gaming	Germany	$71 million	100.2	
21	2 May 2011	Ubitexx	Mobile device management	Germany	Undisclosed	Undisclosed	
22	22 July 2011	Jaycut	Video editing	Sweden	Undisclosed	Undisclosed	
23	7 October 2011	NewBay	Content provider	Ireland	$100 million	143.1	
24	8 March 2012	Paratek	RF multi-band handsets	United States	Undisclosed	Undisclosed	
25	May 2013	Scroon	Social marketing company	France	Undisclosed	Undisclosed	
26	29 July 2014	Secusmart GmbH	Voice and data encryption	Germany	Undisclosed	Undisclosed	
27	11 September 2014	Movirtu	Virtual SIM solutions	United Kingdom	Undisclosed	Undisclosed	
28	21 April 2015	WatchDox Ltd.	Enterprise data sync and share	Israel	Undisclosed	Undisclosed	
29	22 July 2015	AtHoc, Inc.	Networked crisis communications	United States	Undisclosed	Undisclosed	
30	4 August 2015	Good Technology	Mobile security provider	United States	$425 million	577.3	
31	19 February 2016	Encription Ltd.	Cybersecurity services	United Kingdom	Undisclosed	Undisclosed	
32	16 November 2018	Cylance Inc.	Security firm	United States	$1.4 billion	1.8	
