= Rama Yade =

French politician

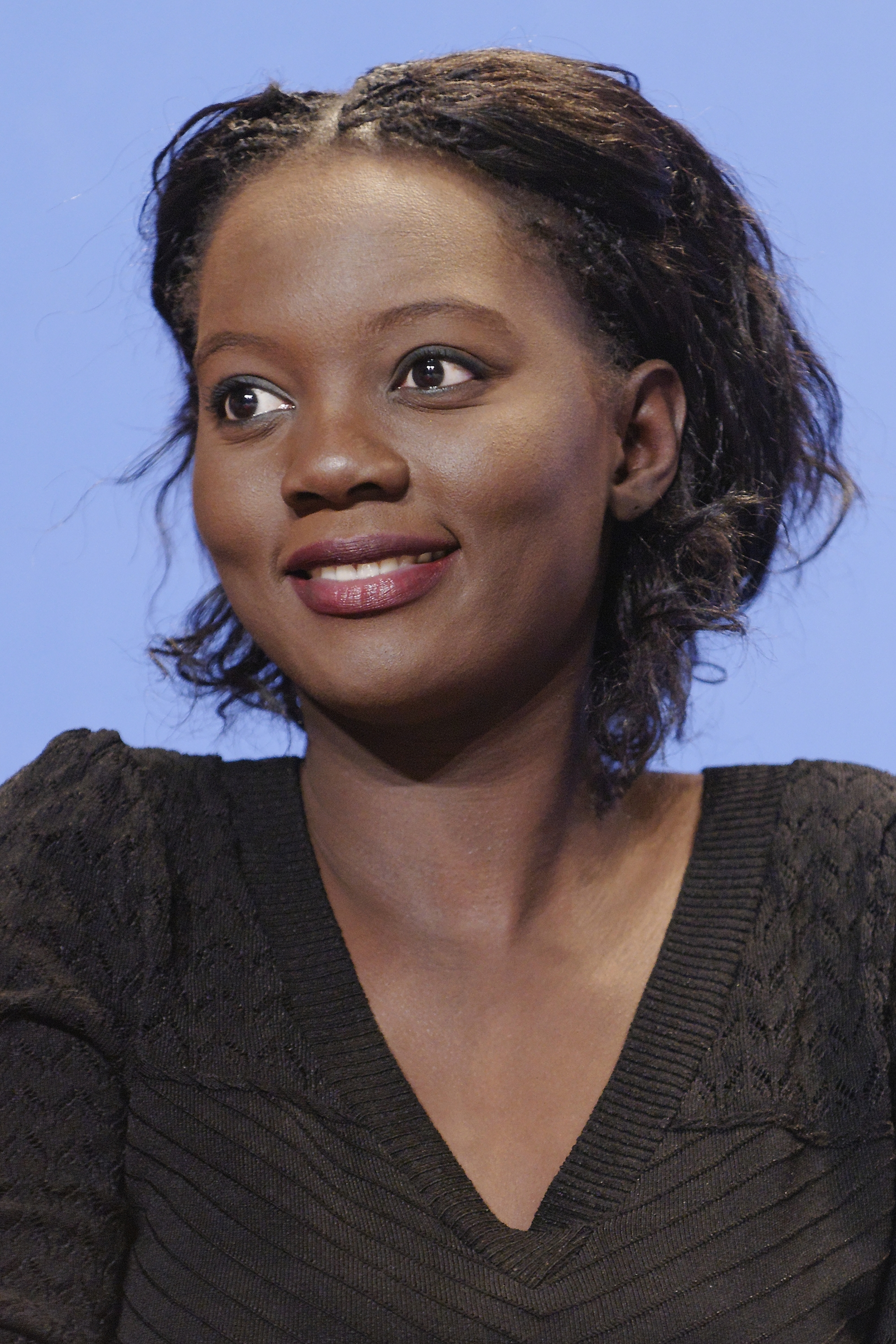
- Rama Yade in 2010

Member of the Regional Council of Île-de-France
- In office 21 March 2010 – 18 December 2015
- President: Jean-Paul Huchon

Ambassador of France to UNESCO
- In office 22 December 2010 – 30 June 2011
- Preceded by: Catherine Colonna
- Succeeded by: Daniel Rondeau

Secretary of State for Sports
- In office 23 June 2009 – 13 November 2010
- President: Nicolas Sarkozy
- Prime Minister: François Fillon
- Preceded by: Bernard Laporte
- Succeeded by: Chantal Jouanno

Secretary of State for Foreign Affairs and Human Rights
- In office 19 June 2007 – 23 June 2009
- President: Nicolas Sarkozy
- Prime Minister: François Fillon II
- Preceded by: Lucette Michaux-Chevry (indirectly)
- Succeeded by: None (Position abolished)

Personal details
- Born: 13 December 1976 (age 49) Ouakam, Dakar, Senegal
- Party: UMP
- Spouse: Joseph Zimet
- Education: Sciences Po

Rama Yade (born Mame Ramatoulaye Yade; 13 December 1976) is a Senegalese-born French politician and author who has been director of the Atlantic Council’s Africa Center since 2021.

Rama was the French Secretary of Human Rights from 2007 to 2009, and the Secretary of Sports from 2009 to 2010. She was the Permanent Delegate of France to UNESCO from December 2010 to June 2011. She held the vice-presidency of the centre-right Radical Party up until 25 September 2015. She announced her candidacy in the 2017 French presidential election, but was unable to obtain enough signatures to be a participant in the presidential race. Her campaign was aimed at "the forgotten people" of France.

== Early life and education ==
Yade was born in Ouakam, Dakar, Senegal. She comes from an educated, upper-middle-class, Lebou family. Her mother, Aminata Kandji, was a professor and her father, Djibril Yade, also a professor, was the personal secretary of Senegalese President Léopold Sédar Senghor and a diplomat. She moved to France with the rest of her family at the age of eight. After her father left the country when she was fourteen, she moved into a council flat in Colombes with her mother and three sisters.

Yade was educated in Catholic schools and then at the Institut d'Études Politiques de Paris, where she graduated in 2000.

== Early career ==
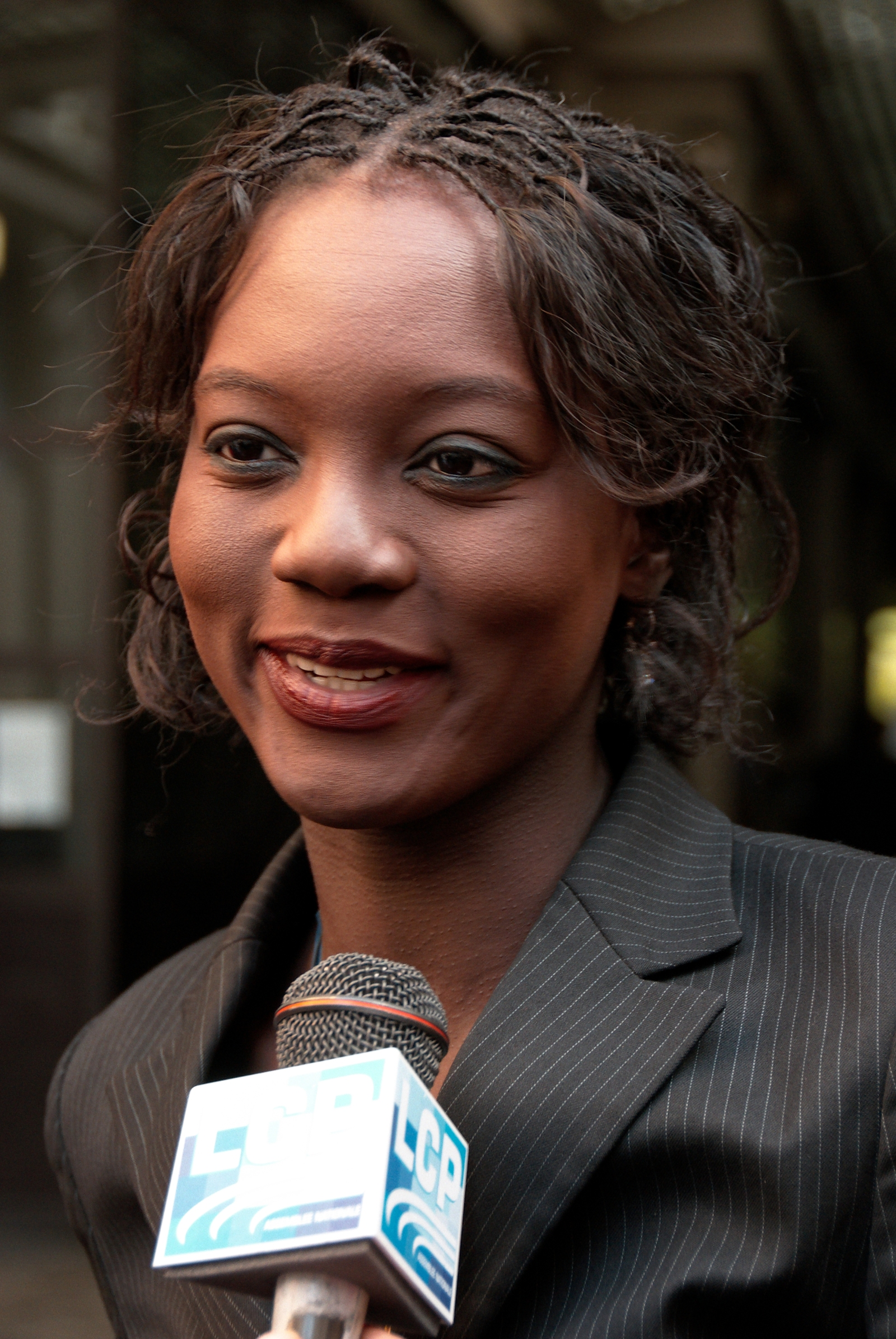
Rama Yade, May 2007

Yade worked at the Paris city hall and the National Assembly. She also worked for The Greens. She later became an administrator in the Senate in 2002.

== Political career ==
Yade joined the Union for a Popular Movement (UMP) political party in 2005 and became National Secretary in charge of Francophonie in 2006. She credits Nicolas Sarkozy's charisma with making her want to join the UMP.

=== Career in government ===
In May 2007, Yade was appointed as Secretary of State for Human Rights under the Minister of Foreign and European Affairs, Bernard Kouchner. In this capacity, she notably denounced Sarkozy's invitation to Muammar Gaddafi for state visit to France in 2008, citing the Libya's track record of human rights abuse.

On 6 November 2007, Yade was among the guests invited to the state dinner hosted by U.S. President George W. Bush in honor of Sarkozy at the White House.

In November 2008, Yade was rumoured to be Sarkozy's favorite choice for replacing Jean-Pierre Jouyet as Secretary of State for European Affairs, and was also privately asked to lead one of the UMP lists for the 2009 European Parliament elections. However, on 7 December, she declined to run for a seat in the European Parliament and declared herself "more interested in national mandate". On 9 December, Le Monde reported that Nicolas Sarkozy was "deeply disappointed" by her attitude and that she had "ruined all her chances" to succeed Jouyet. The following day, Foreign Minister Bernard Kouchner, in an interview with Le Parisien, said he regretted his suggestion to appoint a Secretary of State for Human Rights, although he noted that Yade had "done, with talent, what she could do". She had at the time the highest approval rating in the French government, with over 70%.

Yade was moved to the post of Secretary of State for Sports on 24 June 2009. Some interpreted this as a demotion in connection with Sarkozy's disapproval of her decision to not stand in the European elections. In 2010, she criticised the France national football team for staying in expensive hotels during the Great Recession.

=== Ambassador to UNESCO ===
Yade was appointed as French Ambassador to the UNESCO in December 2010. By April 2011, it was rumoured that she would be fired. She quit her job in June 2011.

=== Radical Party ===
In 2012, Yade left the UMP, joined the Radical Party and supported Jean-Louis Borloo in the presidential elections until he decided not to run. She later supported Nicolas Sarkozy, but joined the New Centre. She serves as President of the Allons Enfants! think tank.

=== Parliamentary elections ===
Yade ran and lost in the 2012 parliamentary elections in Hauts-de-Seine's 2nd constituency for the National Assembly of France. She now works for a human resources firm based in Paris, Cursus Management.

== Political positions ==
Yade is moderate-conservative and a feminist.

=== Affirmative action ===
She favors affirmative action.

=== Burqas ===
In 2009, she said that she was not opposed to ban on burqas in France. Rama believes that this ban should be decided "as a defense of secularism and the dignity of women" and calls on Muslims to "leave the literal text behind, and adjust to the times". In 2010, she called for a referendum on banning the full veil burqas in France, in order to circumvent any legal obstacles.

=== LGBT rights ===
As Secretary of State for Foreign Affairs and Human Rights of France, Yade met with several LGBT organizations on the International Day Against Homophobia and Transphobia in 2008 and announced to the organizations that henceforth the government officially recognized that day. She announced that she would appeal to the United Nations for the universal decriminalization of homosexuality, and asked, "How can we tolerate the fact that people are stoned, hanged, decapitated and tortured only because of their sexual orientation?" When asked about the issue of same-sex marriage in 2009, she replied that it was not up to her to settle the question for society.

When she became Secretary of State for Sports, she fought against homophobia in sports and participated in the third FARE Conference Against Homophobia in Paris in 2011.

In a June 2011 interview she said she would have voted for same-sex marriage if she had been in the National Assembly. In a 2012 interview with Le Parisien, she said, "To societal issues like this or gay marriage, it is legitimate to propose a referendum. We'll see if the left will have the courage to give voice to the people." She said in 2013 interview that her support for same-sex marriage was consistent with her fight on equal rights and claimed that she had been designated as the most gay-friendly member of the government. On 1 February Rama Yade had signed with MP Yves Jégo, Jean-Christophe Lagarde, Senator Chantal Jouanno, an article in Le Monde in favor of gay marriage in the name of equality.

=== Foreign vote ===
When asked about the issue of foreign vote, Yade said it should be left to a referendum and said she was against it and said "Foreigners do not claim the right to vote. What they want is their children who are French, are elected to the Assembly, are well represented in the political, economic spheres media. In short, they are integrated. Now this is the bad conscience of the left for thirty years."

=== Syrian Civil War ===
On the issue of the civil war in Syria, she said France must act and use the military option because the Syrians requested it.

=== Taxes ===
On the issue of taxes, Yade has said "We're losing the rich, like Gérard Depardieu, and the poor feel betrayed," referring to workers at factories expected to close down. "France is the one getting weakened, and its future is being sold off cheaply," she said.

== Convictions ==
In April 2013, Yade was convicted for libeling and slandering Manuel Aeschlimann.

In September 2013, Yade was sentenced to pay a 2000 euro fine and 4000 euros in damages for libeling her political rival Philippe Sarre.

In January 2014, Yade was again convicted for slandering Jean-Marie Le Pen and his daughter Marine Le Pen.

== Personal life ==
Yade is married to Joseph Zimet, the son of Yiddish singer Ben Zimet, and an adviser to former Secretary of State Jean-Marie Bockel. Her husband is Jewish. Yade considers herself a feminist.

== Bibliography ==
- Yade, Rama (2007). Noirs de France. Paris: Calmann-Lévy. ISBN 9782702137611. OCLC 777938838.
- Yade, Rama (2008). Les droits de l'homme expliqués aux enfants de 7 à 77 ans. Paris: Editions du Seuil. ISBN 9782020988292. OCLC 425659228.
- Yade, Rama (2010). Lettre à la jeunesse. Paris: Bernard Grasset. ISBN 9782246783503. OCLC 758820242.
- Yade, Rama (2011). Plaidoyer pour une instruction publique. Paris: Bernard Grasset. ISBN 9782246794776. OCLC 780310918.
- Yade, Rama (2014). Carnets du pouvoir 2006-2013. Paris: Les Éditions du Moment. ISBN 9782354173265. OCLC 899382315.
- Yade, Rama (2015). Anthologie regrettable du machisme en politique. Paris: Éditions du Moment. ISBN 9782354173906. OCLC 911259855.
- Yade, Rama (2016). À l'instant de basculer. Paris: Les Éditions du Net. ISBN 9782312049373.
