= Mformation =

Mformation Software Technologies LLC.
- Type: Acquired by Alcatel-Lucent
- Industry: Internet of Things, Device Management
- Founded: Edison, New Jersey, USA (1999)
- Products: MFORMATION SERVICE MANAGER Suite; MFORMATION SERVICE MANAGER for WiMAX; IMPACT (Intelligent Management Platform for All Connected Things)
- Website: www.mformation.com

Mformation Software Technologies was a software company. Mformation was founded in 1999. Founder Dr. Rakesh Kushwaha was serving as the company's CTO. Kevin A. Wood was the CEO. Mformation was a member of the Open Mobile Alliance (OMA), which works to support, extend and improve the standards for remote device management. On 17 September 2015, Alcatel-Lucent announced that it was acquiring Mformation for an undisclosed amount to strengthen its Customer Experience Management solution.

== Locations ==
Mformation was headquartered in Woodbridge, New Jersey, with offices and subsidiaries around the globe including Bangalore, India.

== Patent lawsuit ==
Mformation sued Research In Motion (RIM) in 2008, accusing it of infringement of two patents. In July 2012, jurors in federal court in San Francisco determined that RIM's software, which lets companies manage workers’ BlackBerry devices remotely, infringed Mformation’s patents. RIM was found liable for $147.2 million in damages but judge overturned the ruling.
