= Étienne Gernelle =

French journalist

- Born: 3 May 1976; Paris

Étienne Gernelle (born May 3, 1976 in Paris) is a French journalist and the director of the weekly magazine Le Point.

== Biography ==
=== Youth and education ===
Étienne Gernelle is the son of an agronomy engineer who worked for the World Bank and the United Nations in Togo, who died when Étienne was twelve years old. His mother raised him with his three sisters.

He became a boarding school student at Poitiers and then attended the Lycée Saint-Jean de Passy. He was admitted to the Paris Institute of Political Studies on his fourth attempt and graduated from the 2001 class.

In 2000, he embarked on a year-long cycling trip from Samarkand (Uzbekistan) to Ulaanbaatar (Mongolia), covering a distance of 3,500 km, with an average of 10 km per day.

=== Career ===
He worked at Libération, then in the foreign affairs section of Le Figaro, and joined Le Point in 2001. Initially he was a journalist covering the economics section, where he in turn addressed social issues, aeronautics, defense, and energy, before being appointed deputy director of the editorial staff in November 2008, then director of the editorial staff in 2010. In January 2014, at the age of 37, he became the new head of Le Point, succeeding Franz-Olivier Giesbert. He interviewed various personalities on BFM TV such as Harlem Désir, Nathalie Kosciusko-Morizet and Marine Le Pen and appeared on LCI Matin.

In May 2018, following an issue of Le Point featuring a cover photo of Turkish president Recep Tayyip Erdoğan titled "The dictator. How far will Erdogan go? Investigation into the Turkish president, his megalomania, his networks in France, his offensive on Algeria, his crimes..." Gernelle says he was the target of a harassment campaign by Erdoğan's supporters and his AK Party, and had received death threats. The editorial staff of Le Point, as well as newsstands that displayed this front page in Nîmes, Le Pontet (a suburb of Avignon), Valence and Lyon were also threatened - in Le Pontet the posters were removed from the newsstands, and in Valence.

On September 29, 2022, he appeared for the first time on Les Grosses Têtes hosted by Laurent Ruquier on RTL.

On June 25, 2024, he was chosen to replace Alba Ventura for the upcoming school year in the political editorial at 7:18 on RTL, after already replacing her during her absence in March and April 2024.

=== Political positions ===
He advocates for liberal reforms in the French economy, viewing France as a "little Soviet Union."

Mediapart claims that his takeover at Le Point was accompanied by a sharp turn of the magazine towards far-right ideology, with increased presence of conspiracy theory and far-right discourse, as well as numerous lapses in professional ethics, some of which have been penalized by the justice system. In his capacity as director of publication for Le Point, he has been convicted in some of these cases.

=== Legal matters ===
As the director of publication, he was convicted in 2017 following a defamation complaint by the former Mayor of Asnières-sur-Seine, Sébastien Pietrasanta, related to the affair of a fake porn video at the Asnières town hall.

In 2021, Le Point and Étienne Gernelle (as director of publication) were convicted for defamation due to an article by journalist Aziz Zemouri that labeled actor Sand Van Roy a "call girl," discrediting her testimony in the rape case involving Luc Besson. The same parties were convicted again in 2022 after another article that reported a non-existent complaint filing in Belgium, suggesting that she "filed rape complaints without any foundation."

=== Published works ===
- Gernelle, Étienne (10 February 2006). Les nouveaux défis du pétrole (in French). Toulouse: Milan. p. 64. ISBN 2-7459-2106-1.

== See also ==
=== Bibliography ===
- Isabelle Hanne (19 March 2014). "Enfant du "FOG"". Libération (in French). p. 32.
- Delphine Le Goff (16 January 2014). "Etienne Gernelle, Phileas FOG". Stratégies (in French).
- Pascal Galinier (26 January 2010). "Nominations". Le Monde (in French)..
- Enguérand Renault (1 June 2014). "Je veux positionner Le Point sur le très haut de gamme". Le Figaro (in French).
