= Hauts-de-Seine's 2nd constituency =

Constituency of the National Assembly of France

2nd constituency of Hauts-de-Seine
- inline Constituency of the National Assembly of France

- Deputy: Francesca Pasquini; EELV
- Department: Hauts-de-Seine
- Cantons: Colombes-Sud, Asnières-sur-Seine-Nord, Asnières-sur-Seine-Sud
- Registered voters: 63,567

The 2nd constituency of the Hauts-de-Seine is a French legislative constituency in the Hauts-de-Seine département. It elects one Member of Parliament to the National Assembly.

It is represented in the 16th legislature by Francesca Pasquini of EELV.

== Description ==
Hauts-de-Seine's 2nd constituency consists of the south of Colombes and the town of Asnières-sur-Seine to its south. The constituency is part of the western suburbs of Paris contained within a loop of the Seine.

The seat has traditionally supported conservative candidates, however at the 2012 elections it elected a left leaning deputy for the first time.

== Historic Representation ==
Election	Member	Party
1967	Albin Chalandon	UDR
1968	Albin Chalandon	UDR
1973	Albin Chalandon	UDR
1976	Yves Cornic	UDR
1978	Georges Tranchant	RPR
1981	Georges Tranchant	RPR
1986	Proportional representation – no election by constituency	
1988	Georges Tranchant	RPR
1993	Jean-Frantz Taittinger	RPR
1997	Jean-Frantz Taittinger	RPR
2002	Manuel Aeschlimann	UMP
2007	Manuel Aeschlimann	UMP
2012	Sébastien Pietrasanta	PS
2017	Adrien Taquet	LREM
2019	Bénédicte Pételle	LREM
2022	Francesca Pasquini	EELV
2024	Thomas Lam	LR

== Election results ==
=== 2024 ===
Candidate	Party	Alliance	First round			Second round		
Candidate	Party	Alliance	Votes	%	+/–	Votes	%	+/–
Thomas Lam	LR		21,760	41.59	+16.60	27,036	54.84	+24.60
Francesca Pasquini	LÉ	NFP	20,683	39.53	+12.12	22,264	45.16	+9.61
Anne-Caroline Gallimard	LR-RN	UXD	6,817	13.03	+8.68			
Sébastien Phan	DIV		1,188	2.27	N/A			
Julia Pettitt	REC		637	1.22	-3.07			
Ahmed Lakrafi	DVC		564	1.08	N/A			
Julien Puertas	LO		360	0.69	+0.26			
Louis Duroulle	DIV		317	0.61	N/A			
Valid votes			52,326	98.19	-0.19	49,300	97.11	-0.77
Blank votes			777	1.46	+0.13	1,206	2.38	+0.66
Null votes			186	0.35	+0.06	262	0.52	+0.11
Turnout			53,289	74.33	+18.68	50,768	70.79	+13.13
Abstentions			18,402	25.67	-18.68	20,944	29.21	-13.13
Registered voters			71,691			71,712		
Source: Ministry of the Interior, Le Monde
Result						LR GAIN FROM LÉ		

=== 2022 ===
Legislative Election 2022: Hauts-de-Seine's 2nd constituency
Party	Candidate	Votes	%	±%
EELV (NUPÉS)	Francesca Pasquini	10,465	27.41	+8.98
LREM (Ensemble)	Baï-Audrey Achidi	10,227	26.79	-20.22
LR (UDC)	Marie-Do Aeschlimann	9,541	24.99	+1.40
RN	Philippe Millot	1,660	4.35	+0.15
REC	Frédérique Bertier	1,639	4.29	N/A
DVE	Christel Isaac	1,039	2.72	N/A
PRG	Hadrien Laurent	1,022	2.68	N/A
DVD	Sébastien Perrotel	996	2.61	N/A
Others	N/A	1,587	4.16	
Turnout		38,804	55.65	+2.05
2nd round result
EELV (NUPÉS)	Francesca Pasquini	13,995	35.55	N/A
LREM (Ensemble)	Baï-Audrey Achidi	13,464	34.21	−29.22
LR (UDC)	Marie-Do Aeschlimann	11,903	30.24	−6.33
Turnout		39,362	57.66	+14.06
EELV gain from LREM				

=== 2017 ===
Legislative Election 2017: Hauts-de-Seine's 2nd constituency
Party	Candidate	Votes	%	±%
LREM	Adrien Taquet	17,136	47.01	N/A
LR	Marie-Do Aeschlimann	8,598	23.59	−4.04
LFI	Nino Schillaci	3,181	8.73	N/A
PS	Chantal Barthelemy-Ruiz	2,101	5.76	−31.80
FN	Liliane Pradier	1,532	4.20	−2.18
EELV	Laurent Guillard	1,435	3.94	−0.14
Others	N/A	2,471		
Turnout		36,454	53.60	−5.37
2nd round result
LREM	Adrien Taquet	18,810	63.43	N/A
LR	Marie-Do Aeschlimann	10,844	36.57	−9.90
Turnout		29,654	43.60	−11.87
LREM gain from PS		Swing		

=== 2012 ===
Legislative Election 2012: Hauts-de-Seine's 2nd constituency
Party	Candidate	Votes	%	±%
PS	Sébastien Pietrasanta	14,080	37.56	+14.61
UMP	Manuel Aeschlimann	10,357	27.63	−19.10
PRV	Rama Yade	5,188	13.84	N/A
FN	Guillaume L'Hullier	2,390	6.38	+3.23
FG	Jean-Michel Tarrin	1,606	4.28	N/A
EELV	Laurent Guillard	1,531	4.08	+1.11
DVD	Laurent Martin Saint Leon	1,001	2.67	N/A
Others	N/A	2,084		
Turnout		37,488	58.97	−1.11
2nd round result
PS	Sébastien Pietrasanta	18,876	53.53	+9.72
UMP	Manuel Aeschlimann	16,384	46.47	−9.72
Turnout		35,260	55.47	+1.23
PS gain from UMP				

=== 2007 ===
Legislative Election 2007: Hauts-de-Seine's 2nd constituency
Party	Candidate	Votes	%	±%
UMP	Manuel Aeschlimann	17,289	46.73	
PS	Michèle Etcheberry	8,492	22.95	
MoDem	Laurent Trupin	3,841	10.38	
FN	Laurent Salles	1,164	3.15	
DVD	Josiane Fischer	1,141	3.08	
LV	Dominique Frager	1,098	2.97	
Far left	Claire Villiers	795	2.15	
Far left	Valérie Joubert	782	2.11	
Others	N/A	2,398		
Turnout		37,519	60.08	
2nd round result
UMP	Manuel Aeschlimann	18,322	56.19	
PS	Michèle Etcheberry	14,286	43.81	
Turnout		33,868	54.24	
UMP hold				

=== 2002 ===
Legislative Election 2002: Hauts-de-Seine's 2nd constituency
Party	Candidate	Votes	%	±%
UMP	Manuel Aeschlimann	16,567	47.32	
PS	Dominique Riera	7,887	22.53	
FN	Alexandrine Hill	2,794	7.98	
DVD	Josiane Fischer	2,752	7.86	
LV	Catherine Bernard	1,186	3.39	
PCF	Catherine Laigle	923	2.64	
Others	N/A	2,902		
Turnout		35,326	67.36	
2nd round result
UMP	Manuel Aeschlimann	19,463	63.63	
PS	Dominique Riera	11,125	36.37	
Turnout		31,668	60.39	
UMP hold				

=== 1997 ===
Legislative Election 1997: Hauts-de-Seine's 2nd constituency
Party	Candidate	Votes	%	±%
RPR	Frantz Taittinger	11,968	35.44	
LV	Dominique Frager	7,505	22.23	
FN	Hubert Massol	5,850	17.33	
PCF	Catherine Laigle	2,508	7.43	
GE	Alain Houzel	1,448	4.29	
DVD	Alain Debionne	939	2.78	
LO	Jean-Paul Macé	917	2.72	
RPR	Olivier Chazoul*	885	2.62	
Others	N/A	1,746		
Turnout		34.919	63.77	
2nd round result
RPR	Frantz Taittinger	20,136	57.87	
LV	Dominique Frager	14,662	42.13	
Turnout		36,867	67.34	
RPR hold				

* RPR dissident

== Sources ==
- Official results of French elections from 1998: "Résultats électoraux officiels en France" (in French). Archived from the original on 20 December 2011.
