= Bénédicte Pételle =

French politician (born 1971)

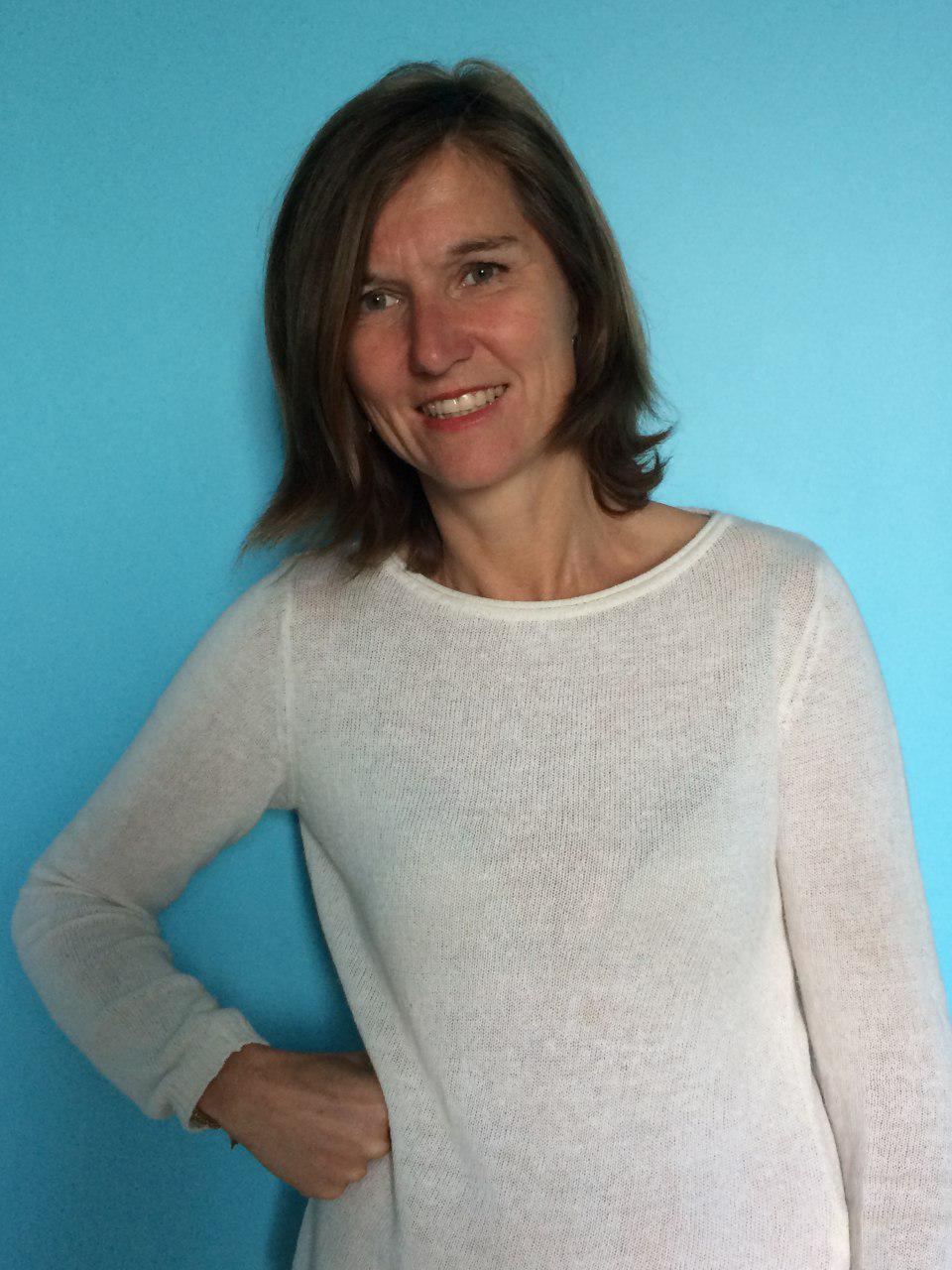

Member of the National Assembly for Hauts-de-Seine's 2nd constituency
- In office 26 February 2019 – 20 June 2022
- Preceded by: Adrien Taquet
- Succeeded by: Francesca Pasquini

Personal details
- Born: 4 June 1971 (age 55) Bourg-en-Bresse, France
- Party: En Commun
- Education: Paris Nanterre University
- Occupation: School teacher

Bénédicte Pételle (French pronunciation: [benedikt petɛl]; née Billaudel, 4 June 1971) is a French school teacher and former politician. She represented the 2nd constituency of Hauts-de-Seine in the National Assembly from 2019 to 2022. She was elected as Adrien Taquet's substitute in the 2017 legislative election, and succeeded him upon his appointment to the second Philippe government.

== Political career ==
In the 2017 legislative election, Pételle was the substitute candidate for Adrien Taquet of En Marche. She entered Parliament when he was made Secretary of State for Child Protection in Prime Minister Édouard Philippe's second government. She sat in the La République En Marche group in the National Assembly and was affiliated with En Commun from 2020 onwards. During her term as a deputy, she focused on child protection.

She did not seek election to a full term in the 2022 legislative election, after La République En Marche! declined to endorse her.

== Personal life ==
Pételle is a devout Catholic and mother to five children. Her father died in the COVID-19 pandemic in France. As part of the Jesuit Refugee Service she regularly welcomes migrants into her home.
