= Marie-Do Aeschlimann =

French politician (born 1974)

Member of the Senate
- Incumbent
- Assumed office 2 October 2023
- Constituency: Hauts-de-Seine

Personal details
- Born: 17 April 1974 (age 51)
- Party: LR (since 2015); UMP (until 2015)
- Spouse: Manuel Aeschlimann (m. 2000)

Marie-Dominique Aeschlimann (née Ristori; born 17 April 1974) is a French politician of The Republicans serving as a member of the Senate since 2023. She has been a member of the Regional Council of Île-de-France since 2004, and has served as a vice president of the council since 2021. She was a municipal councillor of Asnières-sur-Seine from 2001 to 2024, and served as a deputy mayor from 2014 to 2024. In the 2017 and 2022 legislative elections, she was a candidate for the National Assembly in Hauts-de-Seine's 2nd constituency. She is married to Manuel Aeschlimann.
