= Charlotte Caubel =

French politician (born 1972)

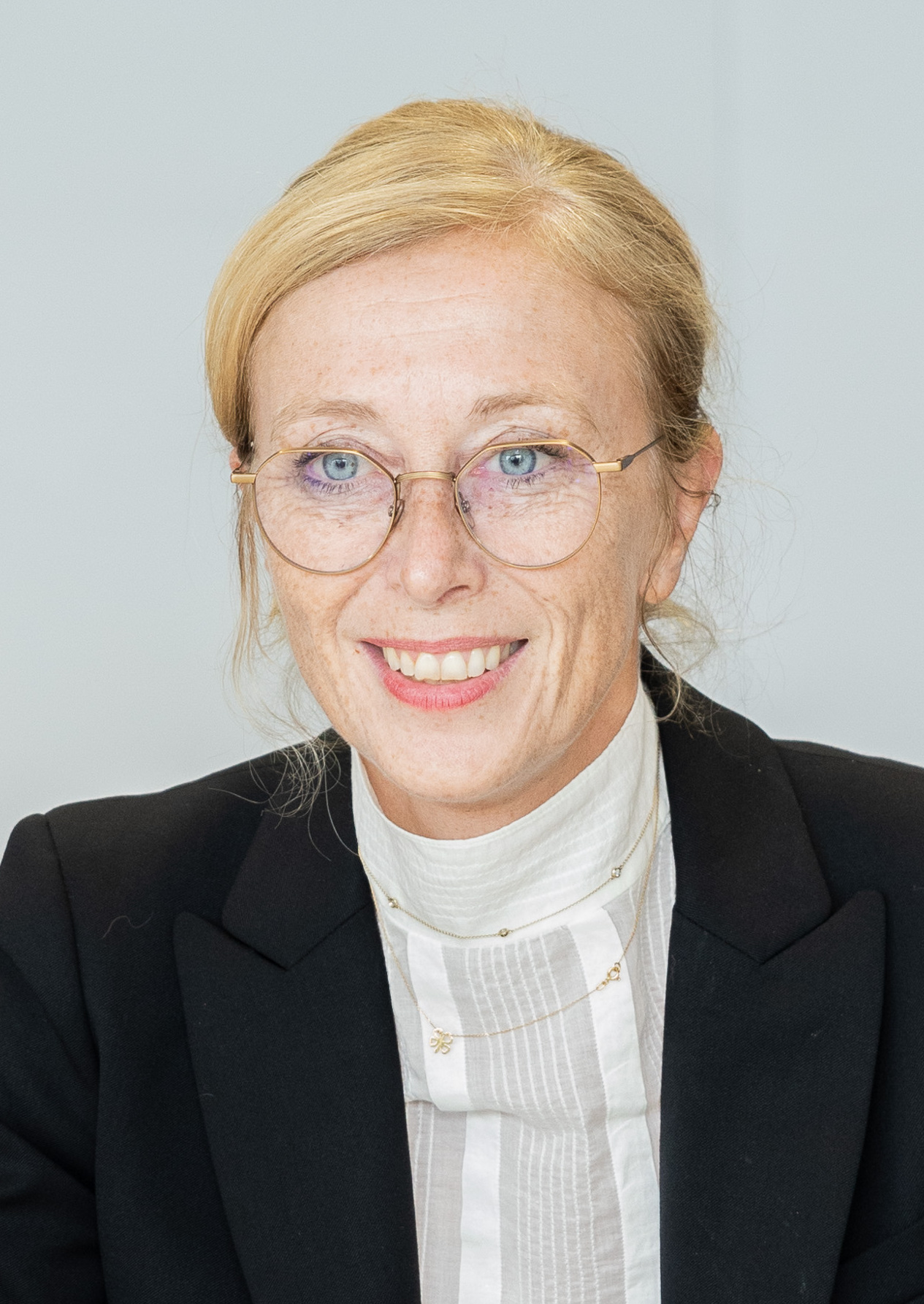
- Charlotte Caubel in 2022

Secretary of State for Child Protection
- In office 20 May 2022 – 11 January 2024
- President: Emmanuel Macron
- Prime Minister: Élisabeth Borne
- Preceded by: Adrien Taquet
- Succeeded by: Sarah El Haïry

Personal details
- Born: 2 June 1972 (age 54) Nancy, France
- Party: Horizons (since 2023); Independent
- Spouse: Alexandre Bompard (m. 1998)
- Children: 3
- Education: Sciences Po; Paris 2 Panthéon-Assas University; French National School for the Judiciary

Charlotte Caubel (born 2 June 1972 in Nancy, France) is a French politician who has been serving as State Secretary for Children in the government of Prime Minister Élisabeth Borne between 2022 and 2024.

== Career ==
From 2020 to 2022, Caubel led the activities on youth protection at the Ministry of Justice.

== Personal life ==
Caubel is married to Alexandre Bompard and the mother of three daughters.
