= Adrien Taquet =

French politician

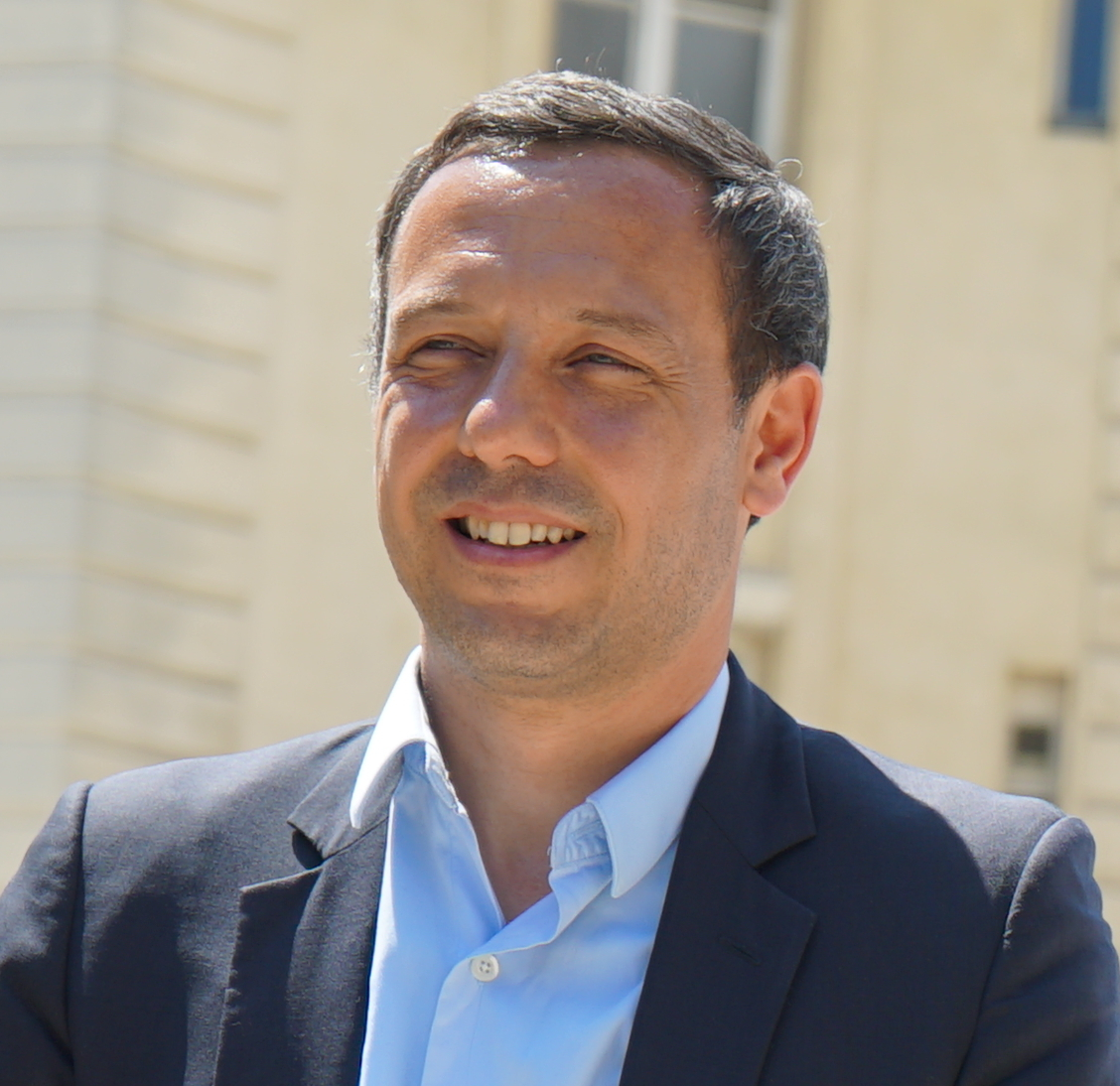
- Adrien Taquet in 2017

Secretary of State for Child protection
- In office 25 January 2019 – 20 May 2022
- President: Emmanuel Macron
- Prime Minister: Édouard Philippe; Jean Castex
- Succeeded by: Charlotte Caubel

Member of the National Assembly for Hauts-de-Seine's 2nd constituency
- In office 21 June 2017 – 25 February 2019
- Preceded by: Sébastien Pietrasanta
- Succeeded by: Bénédicte Pételle

Personal details
- Born: 3 January 1977 (age 49) Paris, France
- Party: Renaissance
- Education: Lycée Florent-Schmitt
- Alma mater: Paris Nanterre University; Sciences Po

Adrien Taquet (French pronunciation: [adʁijɛ̃ takɛ]; born 3 January 1977) is a French politician of La République En Marche! (LREM) who served as Secretary of State for Child Protection in the governments of successive Prime Ministers Édouard Philippe and Jean Castex from 2019 to 2022. From 2017 until 2019, he was a member of the French National Assembly, representing the department of Hauts-de-Seine.

== Early career ==
From 2002 until 2004, Taquet worked as a parliamentary assistant to Dominique Strauss-Kahn, alongside Matthias Fekl and Gilles Finchelstein.

From 2004 until 2013, Taquet worked at communications consultancy Havas. In 2013, he joined forces with Gabriel Gaultier on founding advertising agency Jésus and Gabriel, which had Quick, Clan Campbell and Eurostar as clients.

== Political career ==
Having been one of the founding members of LREM, Taquet is credited with having created the party's visual identity and name in 2015.

From 2017 until 2019, Taquet was a member of the National Assembly, representing Hauts-de-Seine. During that time, he served on the Committee on Social Affairs, where he focused on the subjects of disability, autism and the condition of prisoners. In addition to his committee assignments, he was an alternate member of the French delegation to Parliamentary Assembly of the Council of Europe, where served on the Committee on Rules of Procedure, Immunities and Institutional Affairs (2017-2018) and of the Sub-Committee on Media and Information Society (2017-2019).

In January 2019, Taquet was appointed Secretary of State to Minister of Health Agnès Buzyn.

Amid revelations on the Jeffrey Epstein affair in 2019, Taquet and fellow cabinet member Marlène Schiappa publicly called for an investigation to examine suspected rape and sexual abuse of under-age girls in France or abroad, in which perpetrators or victims of the crimes may have been French. Shortly after, Paris prosecutor Rémy Heitz opened a preliminary investigation into possible crimes including rape of girls below the age of 15 and conspiracy to commit crimes punishable by at least five years in jail.

In 2020, Taquet became one of the architects of the Castex government's reform of parental leave in France, by doubling France's paternity leave from 14 days to 28 days, with allowances paid for by the state, and by requiring fathers to take a week off with their newborn children in an effort to reduce inequalities in the first few months of children's lives.

In late 2020, Taquet appointed Élisabeth Guigou to lead a government-mandated committee on sexual violence against children; she resigned shortly after a high-profile scandal involving her friend Olivier Duhamel. In 2021, Macron directed Taquet and Minister of Justice Éric Dupond-Moretti to develop proposals for tightening laws regarding child sexual abuse.

== See also ==
- 2017 French legislative election
- Castex government
- Second Philippe government

Political offices
New title	Secretary of State for Child Protection; 2019–2022	Succeeded by Charlotte Caubel
Order of precedence
Preceded by Joël Giraud as Secretary of State for Rurality	Order of precedence of France; Secretary of State for Child Protection	Succeeded by Laurent Fabius as Former Prime Minister
