= Georges Plassat =

French businessman (born 1949)

- Born: 25 March 1949 (age 77); Bollène, France
- Education: École hôtelière de Lausanne; Cornell University
- Occupation: Businessman
- Title: Former chairman and CEO of Carrefour
- Term: 2012 – July 2017
- Predecessor: Lars Olofsson
- Successor: Alexandre Bompard

Georges Plassat (born 25 March 1949) is a French businessman. He was the chairman and chief executive officer (CEO) of Carrefour from 2012 to July 2017.

== Biography ==
=== Early life ===
Georges Plassat earned degrees from the École hôtelière de Lausanne in Switzerland and Cornell University.

=== Career ===
After starting his career at Hilton Worldwide, Plassat worked for Eurest and Groupe Casino, where he served as CEO and then chairman. While at Casino, he insisted on giving stock options to all employees, including cashiers. However, he left the company in 1997 after a disagreement with Jean-Charles Naouri, his successor as CEO, over the future of the company.

He went on to work for French apparel group Vivarte, whose brands include André, Kookaï, La Halle, Naf-Naf and Chevignon. He was named director and CEO in 2004.

In June 2012, Plassat became CEO of Carrefour, replacing Lars Olofsson. He quickly reconsidered the group's strategy in France and internationally and obtained excellent results with growth in all regions except from Asia. He notably decided to give store managers the power to adapt to local tastes. In June 2015, he was renewed as chairman and CEO after obtaining 90% of the votes at the group's shareholders general assembly.

He also serves on the board of directors of the Consumer Goods Forum.

In June 2017, the board of directors chose Alexandre Bompard as the new chairman and CEO of Carrefour with effect from July 2017.

=== Awards ===
Plassat is a knight of the Legion of Honor. In 2016, he was named among the winners of the 2016 All-Europe Executive Team by Institutional Investor.

=== Personal life ===
He enjoys playing rugby and going to the opera.
