= Dash Express =

Discontinued Internet-enabled GPS navigator

The Dash Express was an Internet-enabled personal navigation device manufactured by Dash Navigation Dash Express transmitted information using a GPRS connection back to Dash Navigation in order to enhance traffic routing as well as use Wi-Fi for the purpose of updating GPS. At the time of its availability, the Dash Express was only available for use in the US.

In June 2009, Research in Motion has acquired Dash Navigation, and discontinued service and support of the Dash Express product effective June 30, 2010.

== Hardware ==
The hardware of the dash express was developed by Taiwanese hardware manufacturer FIC (First International Computers), in its Openmoko division. It was developed under the code name "Dash Cavalier" with the model number HXD8v2.
