= Thomas Lam (politician) =

French politician (born 1981)

Member of the National Assembly for Hauts-de-Seine's 2nd constituency
- Incumbent
- Assumed office 18 July 2024
- Preceded by: Francesca Pasquini

Personal details
- Born: 22 October 1981 (age 44) Villeurbanne, France
- Party: Horizons; The Republicans

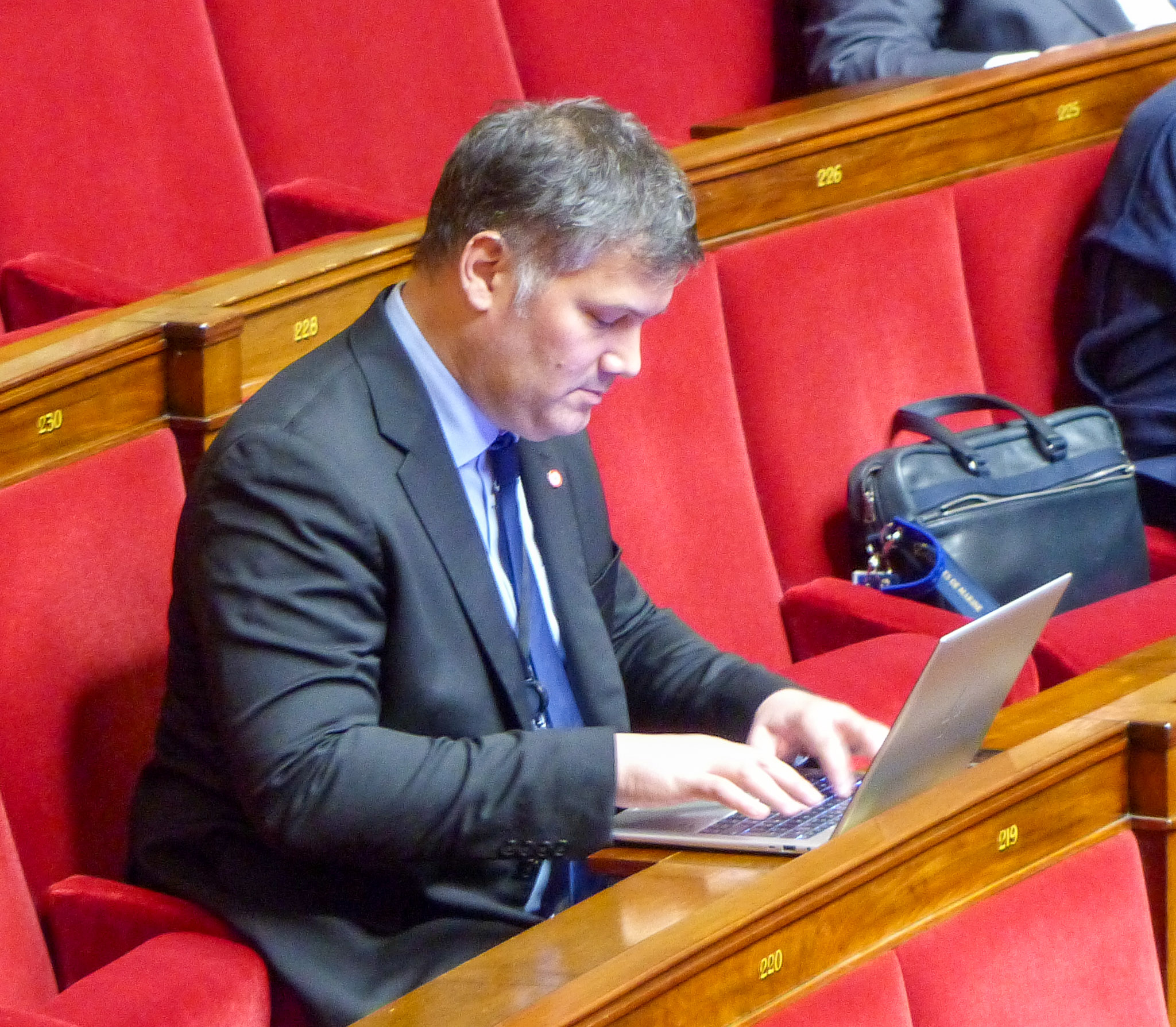
Thomas Lam sat in the National Assembly

Thomas Lam (born 22 October 1981) is a French politician of The Republicans. In the 2024 legislative election, he was elected member of the National Assembly for Hauts-de-Seine's 2nd constituency. He has been a member of the Departmental Council of Hauts-de-Seine since 2021, and served as deputy mayor of Asnières-sur-Seine from 2014 to 2024.

== See also ==
- List of deputies of the 17th National Assembly of France
