= Alexandre Bompard =

French businessman (born 1972)

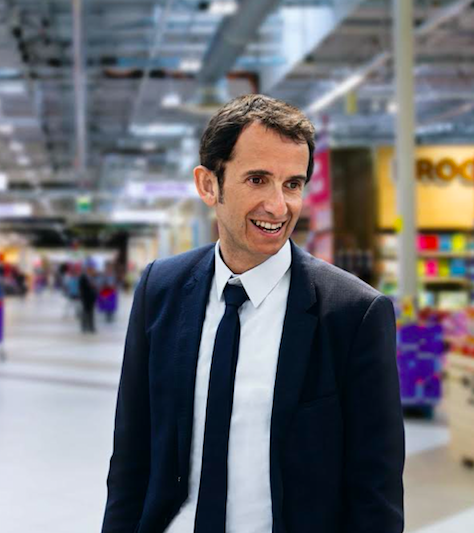
- Born: Alexandre Joubert-Bompard; 4 October 1972 (age 54); Saint-Étienne, France
- Education: Sciences Po, ÉNA
- Occupation: Businessman
- Title: Chairman and CEO, Carrefour
- Term: July 2017-
- Predecessor: Georges Plassat
- Board member of: Fnac
- Spouse: Charlotte Bompard
- Children: 3

Alexandre Bompard (born 4 October 1972) is a French businessman. He has been the chairman and CEO of the retail multinational Carrefour since July 2017. He was chairman and CEO of Fnac (books and multimedia retailer) from 2010 to 2017, and of Europe 1 (radio station) from 2008 to 2010.

== Early life ==
Alexandre Bompard was born on 4 October 1972 in Saint-Étienne, France. He is the son of Alain Bompard, a businessman and president of the AS Saint-Étienne football club from 1997 to 2003.

Bompard graduated from Sciences Po Paris in 1994 and was admitted to the École nationale d'administration where he graduated with the 1999 promotion Cyrano de Bergerac.

== Career ==
After graduation, Bompard joined the Inspection générale des finances. He was a junior inspector until 1999 before being promoted to finance inspector in 2002. After working as a project manager for the chief director of the Inspection générale des finances, he became in 2003 a technical advisor to François Fillon, then Minister of Social Affairs, Labour and Solidarity.

Bompard joined the French broadcaster Canal+ in 2004 as chief of staff for the group's president Bertrand Meheut. In June 2005, was appointed director of the sports department, replacing Michel Denisot. In June 2008, Bompard replaced Jean-Pierre Elkabbach as chairman and CEO of the radio station Europe 1.

In November 2010, Bompard became CEO of French retail chain Fnac. In 2013, Fnac was spun off from the PPR group. Bompard led Fnac's demerger and its successful listing on the Paris stock exchange. Still under his leadership, Fnac acquired Darty in 2016, creating one of France's largest brick-and-mortar retailers. In June 2017, he stepped down from the roles of chairman and CEO of Fnac.

Bompard joined Carrefour as CEO in July 2017. His first move was to set new standards for better food and package sustainability, limitation of food waste, development of bioproducts, e-commerce partnerships, two billion euros in annual investments from 2018 as well as organisational and cost reduction measures. In 2019, he took Carrefour out of China where the group was losing money. In 2024, he led Carrefour's acquisition of Cora and Match (175 chain stores). In November 2024, he issued an apology to the Brazilian agricultural authorities for announcing that Carrefour stores in France would not sell Brazilian meat in a move to protect French agriculture. His tenure was renewed in 2021, and again 2024.

== Other roles ==
- President of the board of advisors of Sciences Po's School of Management and Impact
- Since 2023: President of the Fédération du Commerce et de la Distribution (FCD)

== Distinctions ==
- 2009: Knight in the Ordre des Arts et des Lettres
- 2017: Knight in the Ordre national du Mérite

== Personal life ==
He is married to Charlotte Caubel. They have three daughters.

Business positions
Preceded by Georges Plassat	CEO of Carrefour; 2017–present	Succeeded by Incumbent
