= DigiSync =

Hardware device

DigiSync is a hardware device developed by Research In Motion to allow negative cutters, telecine machines, and ColorMaster to read and log keykode data from motion picture film. It can also be used to capture KeyCode and change emulsion settings on Hollywood Film Company color film analyzers.
