= Dash Navigation =

Defunct American in-car navigation technology company

Dash Navigation was a start-up based in Mountain View, California that produced devices and software for in-car navigation systems. Their first product was Dash Express. In January, 2007 Dash Express won "Best of CES" awards from both CNET and LAPTOP Magazine. The company was also named an Innovations 2007 honoree by the Consumer Electronics Association.

== Hardware ==
The company used Sparkfactor Design for the Product Design (Industrial Design and Mechanical Engineering).

Dash Express was released to the general public in March 2008.

== Acquisition ==
In June 2009 Dash announced an acquisition by Research In Motion for an undisclosed amount. RIM discontinued service and support of the Dash Express product effective June 30, 2010.
