= Francesca Pasquini =

Italian-born French politician

Member of the National Assembly for Hauts-de-Seine's 2nd constituency
- In office 20 June 2022 – 9 June 2024
- Preceded by: Bénédicte Pételle
- Succeeded by: Thomas Lam

Personal details
- Born: 27 December 1981 (age 43); Viterbo, Italy
- Political party: Génération.s; The Ecologists (until 2024)

Francesca Pasquini (French pronunciation: [fʁɑ̃tʃɛska paskwini]; born 27 December 1981) is an Italian-born French politician from EELV. She became the Member of Parliament for Hauts-de-Seine's 2nd constituency in the 2022 French legislative election.

== See also ==
- List of deputies of the 16th National Assembly of France
