= Sébastien Pietrasanta =

French politician (born 1977)

Member of the French National Assembly for Hauts-de-Seine's 2nd constituency
- In office 20 June 2012 – 20 June 2017
- Preceded by: Manuel Aeschlimann
- Succeeded by: Adrien Taquet

Personal details
- Born: 7 August 1977 (age 48)
- Party: Socialist Party

Sébastien Pietrasanta (born 7 August 1977) is a French politician. From 2012 to 2017, he was a member of the National Assembly. From 2008 to 2014, he served as mayor of Asnières-sur-Seine.
