= Alexandre Mars =

French businessman

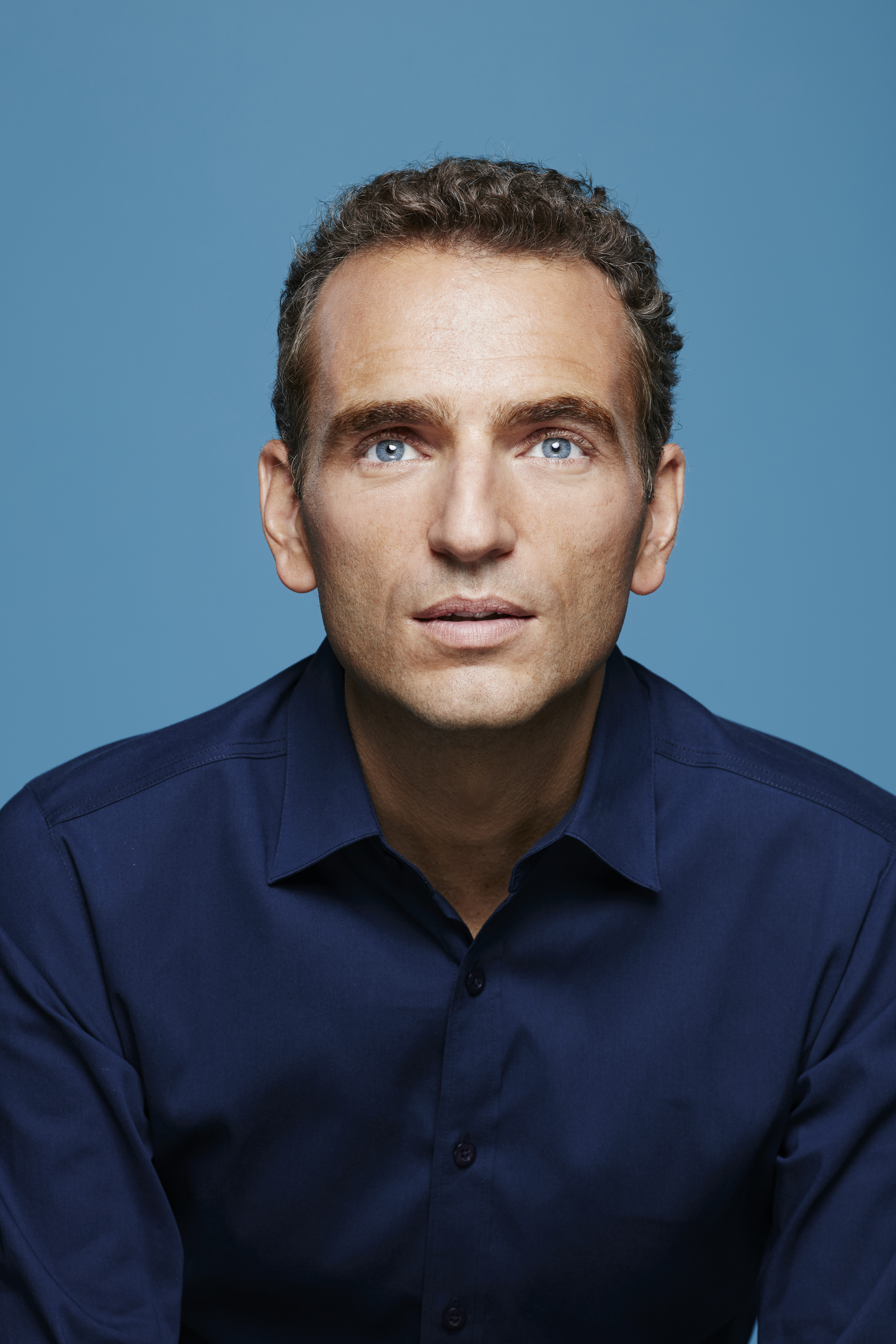
- Alexandre Mars in 2016

Alexandre Mars is a French author.

== Biography ==
Alexandre Mars was appointed by Tony Estanguet to sit on the Paris 2024 board of directors in 2018.

== Awards ==
In 2019, he was named Chevalier de la Légion d'honneur.

== Books ==
- La Révolution du partage, Flammarion, 2018
- Giving: Purpose is The New Currency, HarperOne/HarperCollins, 2019
- Ose ! Tout le monde peut devenir entrepreneur, Coédition Flammarion / Versilio, 2020
- Mission Possible: How to Build a Business for Our Times, Nicholas Brealey Publishing, 2022
- Pause, Pour une vie alignée, Fayard, 2024
- Antidotes, Pour choisir d'avancer, Fayard, 2026
