= Manuel Aeschlimann =

French politician (born 1964)

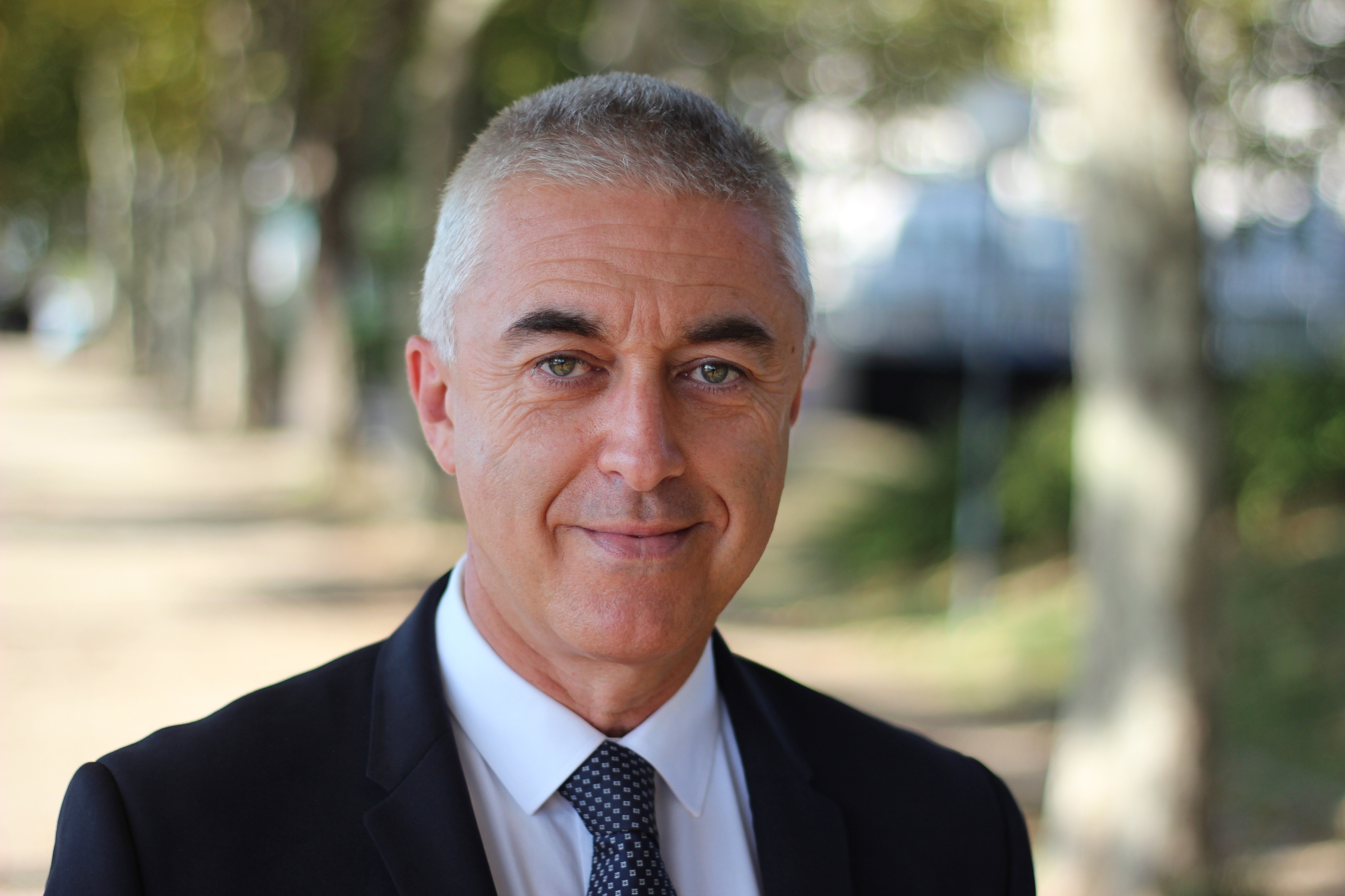

Mayor of Asnières-sur-Seine
- Incumbent
- Assumed office 26 June 2015
- Preceded by: Sébastien Pietrasanta

Member of the National Assembly for Hauts-de-Seine's 2nd constituency
- In office 2002–2012
- Preceded by: Frantz Taittinger
- Succeeded by: Sébastien Pietrasanta

Personal details
- Born: 22 October 1964 (age 61) Asnières-sur-Seine, France
- Party: The Republicans
- Spouse: Marie-Do Aeschlimann (m. 2000)
- Education: Panthéon-Assas University

Manuel Aeschlimann (French pronunciation: [manɥɛl ɛʃliman]; born 22 October 1964 in Asnières-sur-Seine in the Ile de France area, near Paris, France) is a French politician.

He began his political career at the early age of 25, as a city councillor in Asnières-sur-Seine. He was appointed first deputy major and went on to be elected mayor of Asnières in 1999. He was defeated when he sought re-election in 2008.

He was elected deputy to the French National Assembly in June 2002 as a member of the ruling right-wing party UMP. In the 2007 election, he was re-elected with 56.2% of the vote.

He is a close friend of French president Nicolas Sarkozy, of whom he was the political adviser in his successful race for president. Sarkozy is also the godfather of his first son.

== Biography ==
=== Education ===
A student of Notre Dame de Sainte-Croix de Neuilly, he graduated from law at Panthéon-Assas University, and obtained a Master of Law and a diplôme d'études approfondies (DEA) of political science and public sector law.

Lecturer at Assas, he then became a lecturer at the Institut d'Etudes Politiques (IEP or Sciences Po) for several years, specialising in electoral strategy. His contract with IEP was terminated in 2007.

=== Mayor of Asnières-sur-Seine ===
As activist in RPR from 1987, he joined the City Council of Asnières-sur-Seine at the age of 25, and was appointed first deputy mayor. But in 1992, he left the municipal staff, resulting in his exclusion from the RPR. In the same year, he stood in the cantonal elections under the 'Ecology Generation' banner, but was also excluded from this movement. From 1994 to 1999, he was 1st Deputy Mayor of Asnières-sur-Seine from the ruling right coalition. Member of conseil général des Hauts-de-Seine, he chaired the Committee on Culture, Youth and Sports in 1994, and became chairman of the National Coalition of local elected officials for security. He was elected UDF mayor of Asnières-sur-Seine in 1999. He joined the UMP when it was created in 2002.

Since 2006, an investigation is in progress at the brigade suppression of economic crime (OERD) on the electoral roles concerning about 30,000 voters who were sorted by ethnicity for the mayor of Asnières. Manuel Aeschlimann, termination three weeks of the elections would not be surprising. He further asserts that all files of the City Council have been declared to the CNIL and that it reserves the right to sue for slander.

In September 2006, he called the national police to stop the unrest caused in the city council by the city councillorJean-Jacques Semoun, and two other city councillors using a megaphone in order to be heard. The site Rue89 speaks of the "Judicial guerrilla that Aeschlimann lead against his opposition.

Beginning in December 2007, the press leaked a report by the regional chamber of accounts Île-de-France. The City Council indicated that the documents were not those given to the regional chamber of accounts. This document calls into question several aspects of the management of the town hall of Asnières-sur-Seine, in particular fiscal weaknesses and heavy indebtedness, excessive consumption of fuel for vehicles in city hall, a vehicle assigned to the wife of the Mayor, generous legal fee, claims" the "irregular appointment of a technical executive, managing the construction of a parking lot, and a "conflict of interest" of his deputy in real estate transactions. The report, delivered by the CRC in September 2007, did not get published before the 1 December deadline, making possible its publication until after the municipal elections of March 2008. The opposition accused the town hall of covering up the findings of this report.

In the second round of the 2008 municipal elections, the socialists, MoDem (Mouvement Démocrate), and assorted right merged their tickets against him. This coalition was initiated by the joint petition against the non-publication of the report by the regional chamber of accounts. The coalition, led by Sébastien Pietrasanta, Josiane Fischer and Christian Leblond finally won the elections in March 2008, with 51.86% of the vote.

The first municipal council of the newly elected team revealed that the report of the CRC which circulated during the campaign without being officially published was indeed the same as the one received by Manuel Aeschlimann in September 2007.

In January 2009, he is condemned to 18 months in prison (suspended), an ineligibility of four years and a 20,000 euros fine for favoritism in a 1998 public procurement affair. In January 2011, the sentence is confirmed in appeal, the ineligibility being reduced to one year.

=== Member of the Hauts-de-Seine ===
Aeschlimann was elected Deputy for the 2nd constituency of Hauts-de-Seine in the 12th Legislature (2002–2007) on 16 June 2002, by obtaining 63.63% of votes in second round against Dominique Riera. He served on the committee on constitutional laws, legislation and general administration of the Republic, and was reappointed Rapporteur for opinion on the budget of local authorities under the annual finance laws. He is a member of the parliamentary groups of studies on asbestos, cancer and the modernisation of French policy. He has put forward legislative proposals on matters including security, and to encourage rehabilitation of property damaged by graffiti, or to strengthen the measures taken against persons guilty of ill – treatment of elderly.

On 17 June 2007, Aeschlimann was reelected with 56.2% of the votes for the 13th legislature. On 13 March 2009, he was found guilty of favoritism in the awarding of a public contract in 1998 whilst in Asnieres, and sentenced in first instance to 18 months in prison, 4 years of ineligibility for political office and 20 000 euro fine.

=== Action to the UMP and with Nicolas Sarkozy ===
Manuel Aeschlimann becomes adviser to Nicolas Sarkozy in July 2005 after having established and chaired the committee for monitoring public opinion on the UMP. As such he warned the UMP, through surveys focused on a possible failure to win the referendum on the European constitution.

Within the 13th legislature term, he analyses and publishes studies of public opinion and members of the UMP majority in the National Assembly.
