= Thumb keyboard =

Type of keyboard on mobile devices

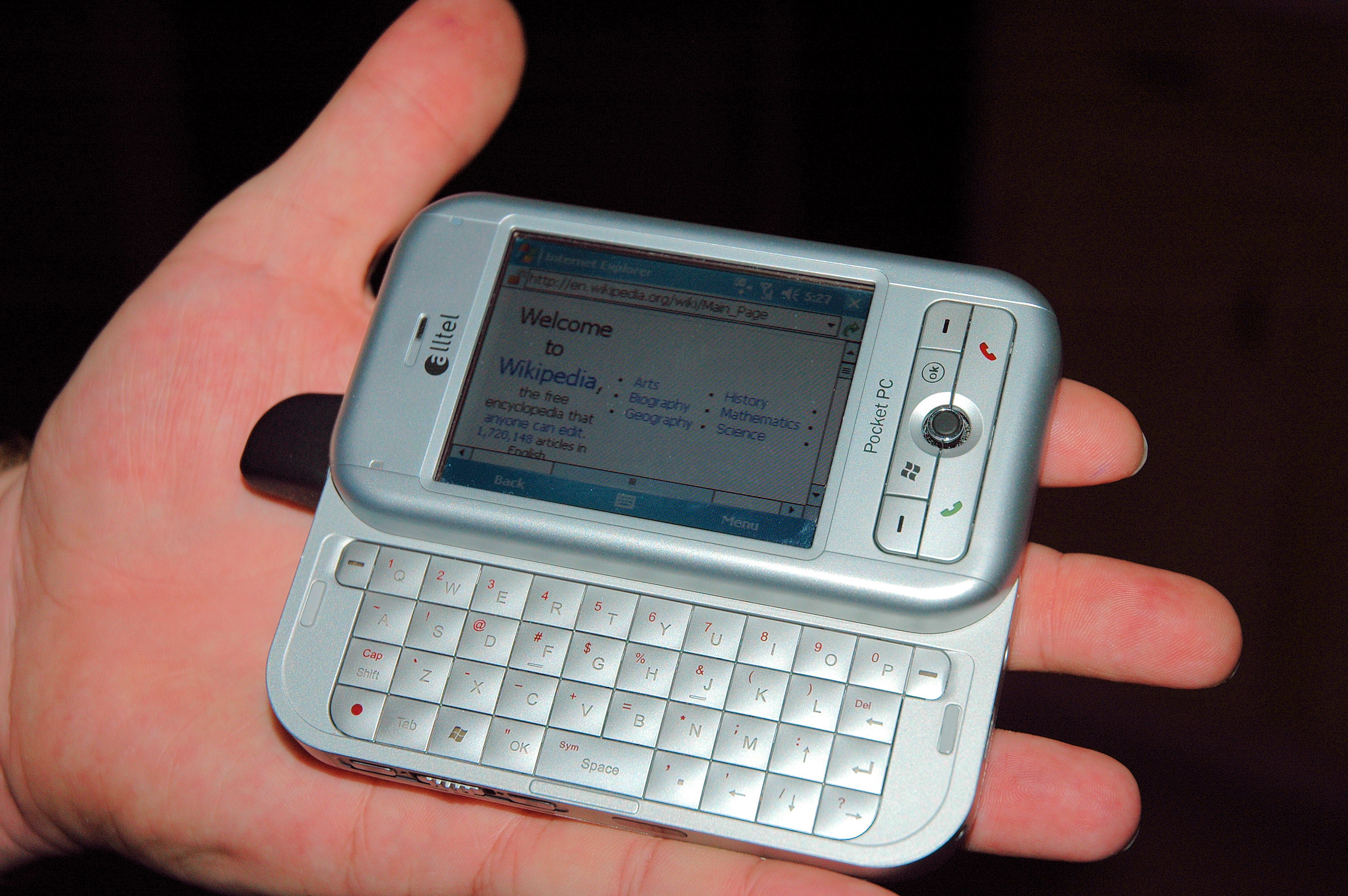
Slider mobile phone

A thumb keyboard, or a thumb board, is a type of keyboard commonly found on PDAs, mobile phones, and PDA phones which has a familiar layout to an ordinary keyboard, such as QWERTY. The inputting surface is usually relatively small and is intended for typing using thumbs, with the other fingers employed to hold the device.

== Devices with thumb keyboards ==
- BlackBerry
- Clicks Technology
  - Clicks Communicator
- Some Hewlett Packard (HP) PDAs
  - IPAQ 4350/4355/63XX series
- HTC
  - HTC Apache
  - HTC Touch Pro
  - HTC Touch Pro2
  - HTC TyTN
  - HTC TyTN II
- Minimal Company
  - Minimal Phone
- Motorola
  - Motorola MPx220
  - Motorola Q
- Nokia
  - Nokia Communicator
  - Nokia Eseries
  - Nokia N97
- Palm
  - Palm Treo smartphones, with the exception of the Treo 180g
  - Palm Tungsten C
- Samsung
  - Samsung Blackjack (SGH-i607)
  - Samsung Galaxy Chat (GT-B5330)
- Sony
  - Some Sony CLIE PDAs
  - Sony Ericsson Xperia X1
- Unihertz
  - Unihertz Titan
- Wibrain: B1, B1L, B1H, I1
- Xbox 360 Chatpad
- Zinwa Technologies
  - Zinwa Q25
