= Motorola Q =

Windows Mobile smartphone

- Manufacturer: Motorola
- Availability by region: May 31, 2006; 20 years ago
- Compatible networks: CDMA
- Weight: 4.06 oz (115 g)
- Operating system: Windows Mobile 5.0 for Smartphone
- CPU: Intel XScale PXA272 312 MHz
- Removable storage: MiniSD
- Rear camera: 1.3-megapixel
- Display: 16-bit Color 320 × 240 TFT display
- Connectivity: Bluetooth
- Data inputs: Illuminated QWERTY Keypad & Side Thumbwheel

The Motorola Q is a Windows Mobile smartphone designed and manufactured by Motorola. It was first announced in the summer of 2005 as a thin device with a similar design to the Motorola Razr. The Motorola Q was first released in the United States on May 31, 2006, initially on the Verizon Wireless network, followed by Sprint in early January 2007 and Amp'd Mobile in April 2007.

The Q differs from Verizon's flagship Windows Mobile phone in that it is very thin, runs the Windows Mobile 5.0 Smartphone Edition OS (lacking touchscreen support), and has a landscape 320×240 screen. It also employs a thumbwheel on the right side of the unit. Motorola hoped to position the Q as an attractive alternative to the BlackBerry.

The Q was released in Canada on June 15, 2006 through Telus Mobility. Bell Mobility began offering the phone later that year (September 22) and then became the first North American carrier to offer a black version of the Motorola Q on November 13, 2006.

In late July 2007, a new model of the Moto Q, the Motorola Q 9, was released. The Motorola Q 9h was released in Italy and across Europe and in November in the US through AT&T. In August of the same year, the Motorola Q9m was released in the US through Verizon. In November, Sprint offered the Motorola Q9c. All Q9 models run Windows Mobile 6.0.

== Specifications ==
- Mobile phone, CDMA model with 800/1900-MHz bands, CDMA2000 1× and CDMA2000 EV-DO networks.
- Intel XScale PXA272 312 MHz processor (Bulverde)
- Runs on Microsoft Windows Mobile 5.0 Smartphone Edition; Optimized for Microsoft Exchange 2003 and a variety of third party email solutions
- Depth - 11.5mm
- QWERTY thumbboard, 5-way navigation button and thumb wheel
- Connectivity via Bluetooth, IrDA and mini-USB
- Multimedia messaging (MMS) (except on Sprint)
- Audio formats supported: iMelody, MIDI, MP3, AAC, WAV, WMA, WAX, QCELP
- Image formats supported: GIF87a, GIF89a, JPEG, WBMP, BMP, PNG
- Mini-SD removable memory card slot (maximum: 2gb)
- Display: (320 × 240 pixels, 65K TFT)
- 1.3-megapixel camera with LED flash
- PIM functionality with picture caller ID
- Speech recognition and speakerphone

== Camera specifications and options ==
=== Camera ===
- 1.3-megapixel digital camera
- Normal, burst, and timer camera modes
- 7 brightness levels
- 5 photo resolutions: 160×120, 176×144, 320×240, 640×480, and 1280×1024
- 4 zoom levels: 1×, 2×, 4×, and 6×
- 6 white balance options: Automatic, Sunny, Cloudy, Indoor Home, Indoor Office, and Night
- Camera "flash": a white LED on the back of the device (on/off; not synchronized with camera shutter)

== PC synchronization ==
The Motorola Q has the ability to synchronize via USB or Bluetooth to a Microsoft Outlook or Microsoft Exchange Server database via Windows Mobile Device Center in Windows Vista or via Microsoft ActiveSync in Windows XP and below, allowing the user to synchronize contacts, emails, tasks, and calendar appointments to the Motorola Q. Microsoft Office files may also be synchronized, but Windows Mobile only supports reading them, and only editing Word. PowerPoint and excel are too advanced to edit.

== Motorola Q support forums ==
The Motorola website includes a forum for user support. Topics include getting started, email setup, bluetooth technology, synching, multimedia features and third-party applications.

== Error reporting ==
As with most smartphones, an automatic error reporting function can be enabled by the user. Several Q users had found a minor malfunction with the first version of the Q which was exclusively sold by Verizon. The malfunction showed that after some time while the phone had been in use, that if text messaging/phone calls or internet/text messaging happened together, the phone would freeze for several minutes. Motorola and Microsoft discovered the error through the error reporting service and now offer an update you can find through Motorola.com. The update repairs the malfunction and resets the phone.

== Black Motorola Q ==
Verizon Wireless released a new version of the Q in mid January 2007 in a new color, producing it in black to compete with the T-Mobile Dash and Cingular's Samsung Blackjack. The outer casing was made in a rubber compound to resist scratches. The new Q also featured 15% more battery life and an update to fix bugs.

== Complete list of Q features and specifications ==
The complete Motorola Q list of specifications are:

Type	Specification
Modes	CDMA 850 / CDMA 1900
Weight	4.06 oz (115 g)
Dimensions	4.57" x 2.52" x 0.47" (116 × 64 × 12 mm)
Form factor	Bar internal antenna
Battery life	Talk: 4.00 hours (240 minutes) Standby: 192 hours (8 days)
Battery type	LiIon 1130 mAh
Display	Type: LCD (color TFT/TFD) Colors: 65,536 (16-bit) Size: 320 × 240 pixels
Platform / OS	Windows Mobile for Smartphones version 5
Memory	64 MB (built-in, flash shared memory)
Phone book capacity	shared memory
FCC ID	IHDT56FQ1 (Approved Dec 14, 2005)
GPS / Location	Type: A-GPS (Relies on Carrier Towers for position calculations)
Digital TTY/TDD	Yes
Hearing aid compatible	Rating: M3 (mostly compatible)
Multiple languages	Yes
Polyphonic ringtones	Chords: 42
Ringer profiles	Yes
Vibrate	Yes
Bluetooth	Supported profiles: HSP, HFP, OPP, FTP, A2DP, AVRC, DUN, HID, BIP, PAN version 1.2 / DUN, HID, BIP
Infrared (IR)	Yes
PC Sync	ActiveSync
USB	built-in mini-USB connector
Multiple numbers per name	Yes
Picture ID	Yes
Ringer ID	Yes
Voice dialing	speaker-independent
Custom graphics	supported formats: GIF87a, GIF89a, JPEG, WBMP, BMP, PNG
Custom ringtones	supported formats: iMelody, MIDI, MP3, AAC, WAV, WMA, WAX, QCELP
Data-capable	Yes
Flight mode	Standard icon: No
Packet data	Technology: 1×EV-DO r0
WAP/Web browser	Browser software: Pocket Internet Explorer
Side keys	thumb-wheel on right
Text keyboard	Layout: QWERTY
Memory Card Slot	Card Type: miniSD
Email Alexa	Yes
MMS	Yes
Text Messaging	2-Way: Yes
Text messaging templates	Yes
Music player	Windows Media Player
Camera	Resolution: 1.3 megapixels
Alarm	Yes
Calculator	Yes
Calendar	Yes
To-Do List	Yes
Voice Memo	Yes
Games	Yes
Headset jack (2.5 mm)	Yes
Speaker phone	Type: full-duplex
