= Motorola Q9c =

Smartphone

Motorola Q9C
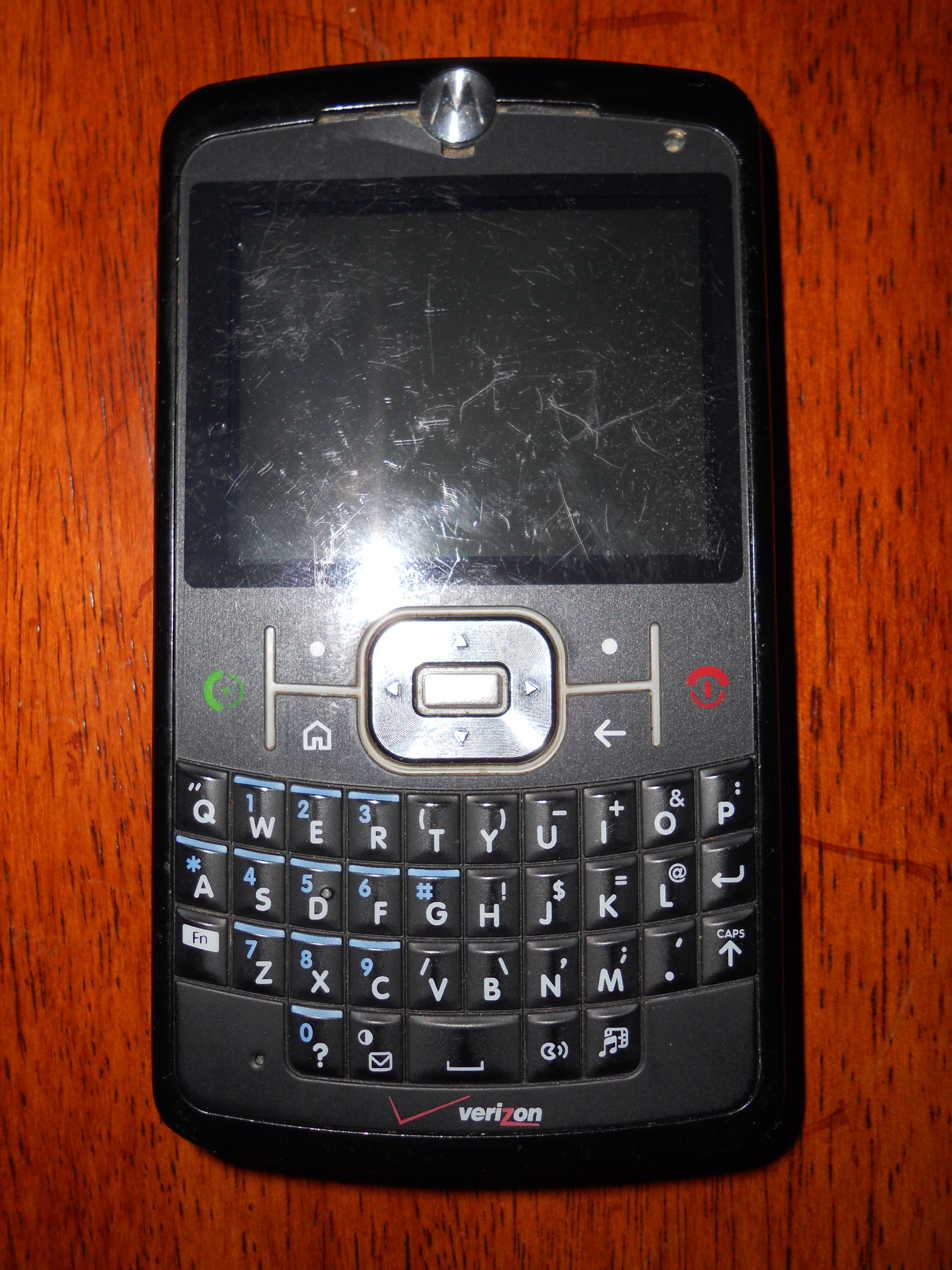
- Manufacturer: Motorola
- Availability by region: November 2007; 18 years ago
- Discontinued: 13 February 2009 (still received smaller updates till 2008)
- Compatible networks: CDMA
- Form factor: Bar
- Dimensions: 4.60×2.55×0.46 in (117×65×12 mm)
- Weight: 4.58 oz (130 g)
- Operating system: Windows Mobile 6.0 Standard; Windows Mobile 6.1 Standard (Motorola Update)
- Removable storage: MiniSD
- Battery: 1170 mAh Li-Ion
- Rear camera: 1.3 Megapixel
- External display: 320 × 240 pixels
- Connectivity: Bluetooth
- Data inputs: Illuminated QWERTY Keypad & Side Thumbwheel

The Motorola Q9c was a smartphone first released in 2007. Initially released as an upgrade to Motorola's Q Series, the Q9C contained a Windows Mobile 6 operating system, push email and instant messaging capabilities, a 1.3 megapixel camera, stereo sound, as well as Bluetooth and GPS navigation.

In addition, the Motorola Q9c also had more advanced features for the time, such as EV-DO high speed data, voice dialing and a full HTML web browser capable of surfing the internet, while being able to use simple e-mail functionality.

Sprint released the Q9c in 2007, and Verizon originally released the Q9c for their network in June 2008. Alltel and U.S. Cellular subsequently released the Q9c in the summer of 2008. AT&T's last used model was the Q9h model, which is the GSM version of the same phone.

In June 2008, Motorola added a software update allowing Sprint customers to officially upgrade their operating system to Windows Mobile 6.1. The phone was discontinued on 13th February 2009.

== Key features ==
The Q9c was a smart phone made in 2007 and discontinued on 13 Feb 2009 that delivered high-speed mobile Web at EV-DO speeds with Microsoft Internet Explorer and USB 1.1 connectivity. Configuration of consumer email accounts (POP3/ IMAP4) and Windows Mobile with Direct Push technology keeps users connected to both work and personal email accounts, in real time. MOTO Q 9c has 128 MB of internal memory and was upgradable up to 32 GB of optional removable memory, and supported Microsoft ActiveSync that allowed users to sync email, contacts and calendars with their PC. However, it used the outdated Windows Mobile that became unpopular in the tech community in comparison to iOS and Android.

== Specifications ==
- Calculator - Yes
- Calendar - MS Pocket Outlook
- Mini-USB Port - Yes, Includes Charging & Data Cable
- Vibrate - Yes
- Phonebook Capacity - Uses Shared Memory
- Multiple Numbers Per Name - No

Messaging features

- HTML Web Browsing - Yes, Opera Browser 8.6 Supports HTML, SSL, JavaScript, Cookies, Bookmarks, Frames and VPNs
- Multimedia Messaging - Yes
- Text Messaging (SMS) - Yes
- Instant Messenger Built-in - Yes
- Email Client - Yes, Pocket Outlook With Attachment Viewing, ActiveSync Over-the-air or USB, POP3/SMTP Support
- Predicting Words and Phrases - Yes

Personalization and fun features

- Polyphonic Ringtones - Yes, 64 Chords, Downloadable
- Custom Ringtones - Yes
- Pre-loaded Ringtones - Yes
- MP3 Ringtones - Yes
- Ringer Profiles - Yes, Plus AAC Real Music Tones Supported
- Picture Caller ID - No
- Multiple Languages - Yes
- Games - Yes, Downloadable
- Customizable Graphics - Yes

Technical specifications

- Application Platform - Java
- Platform / Operating System - Windows Mobile 6; Windows Mobile 6.1 (Using Motorola's update tool)
- Data Download Speed - EV-DO Rev.O (Up to 1.2 Mbit/s Burst Download Speed) Where Available, 1xRTT (Up to 130 kbit/s) Nationally
- Network Compatibility - CDMA 800, 1900
- Ringtone Types Supported - iMelody, MIDI, MP3, AAC, WAV, WMA, WAX, QCELP
- Built-In Memory - 128 MB storage, 64 MB RAM
- Expandable Memory Capacity - Yes, miniSD Card Formats Supported, Up to 32 GB Card Size
- Dimensions - 4.6 in × 2.55 in × 0.46 in
- Weight - 4.58 oz
- Compatible Carrier - Sprint, Verizon, Alltel, U.S. Cellular
- WiFi 802.11 Compatible - With WiFi SDIO Card (Sold Separately)

Box contents

- Additional Items Included - Battery, User Guide, USB Charger Cable, Wall Charger, Bluetooth Earpiece, ActiveSync Software

== See also ==
- Motorola Q
- Windows Mobile
- Smartphone
- ActiveSync
- Windows Mobile Device Center
