= Thumbing =

Thumbing may refer to:

- The act of typing on a small keyboard (known as a thumb keyboard) solely (or primarily) using the thumbs. It is primarily used with mobile phones for SMS text messaging, and also with devices such as PDAs with built-in keyboards.
- A finishing technique used in pottery production. The thumb is used as a smoothing tool, repeatedly stroking corners and edges on pots at the leather hard stage, to round areas on the foot and rim.
- A synonym for hitchhiking.
