= Unihertz Atom =

Smartphone developed by Unihertz

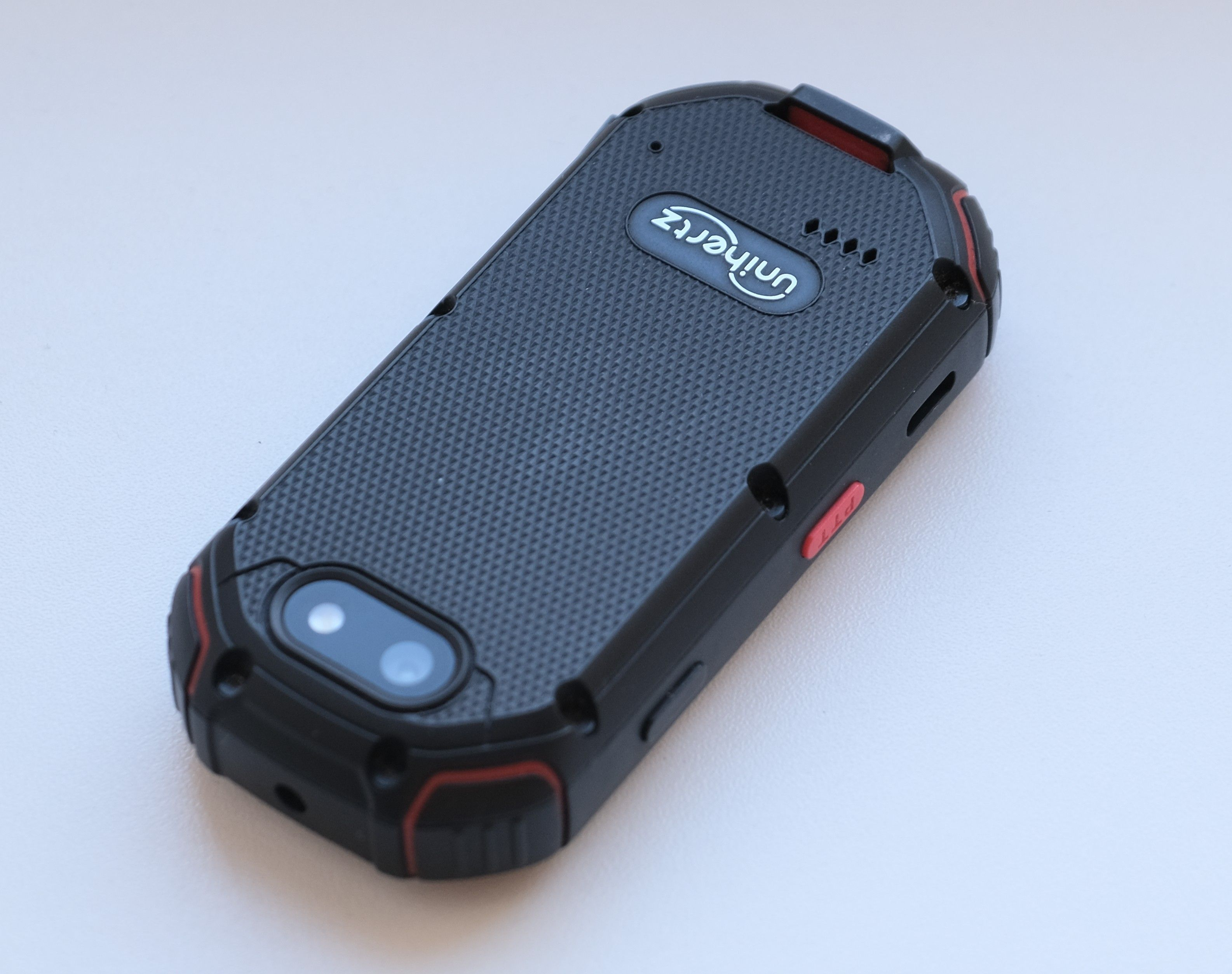
Rear of an Atom

The Unihertz Atom was released in 2018 as Unihertz's second smartphone model after the Jelly. Initially launched through a similar kickstarter project that reached its $50,000 goal in only 60 seconds. It features a 2.45-inch display, very small by industry standards, and at 108 grams (plus battery) is also very lightweight. It has a dedicated push to talk (PTT) button on its side.

== Background ==
Unihertz Atom was marketed as "the ultimate rugged phone for outdoor adventures". Unihertz was associated with a previous very small 3G smartphone, the Posh Micro X, which launched in 2015. Reviews of Jelly and Jelly Pro, the "world's smallest 4G smartphone" have been mixed, but it drew international attention.

== Specifications ==
=== Software ===
	Software
Operating System	Android 8.1 "Oreo"
Processor	Mediatek MT6763 (Helio P23) Octa-core, 2 GHz
Storage	64 GB with no microSD slots
RAM	4 GB
Sensors	G-Sensor, Glonass GPS, Proximity, E-compass, Gyro, NFC
Connectivity	4G LTE, Bluetooth 4.2 low energy WLAN 802.11 b/g/n (2.4 GHz), dual removable Nano-SIM

=== Hardware ===
	Hardware
Display	2.45" 432x240, TFT LCD
Glass	Impact resistant front and rear Corning Gorilla Glass
Rear camera	16 MP
Front camera	8 MP
Audio	Dual purpose speaker
Battery	2,000 mAh non-removable battery
SIM	Removable Dual Nano-SIM
Size	97 x 45 x 19 mm
Weight	108 grams
Colors	Black

== Controversies ==
There have been accusations of poor battery performance, and network traffic possibly sending personal data to China. Responses claim the network traffic is to speed up apps, and the company has been updating the phone software to improve performance. It is not known whether this is connected to similar widespread problems, but the predecessor Posh Micro X was also criticized for running suspect software fotaprovider by adups, and the Jelly Pro does as well.
