= Unihertz Titan =

Line of rugged smartphones with physical keyboards

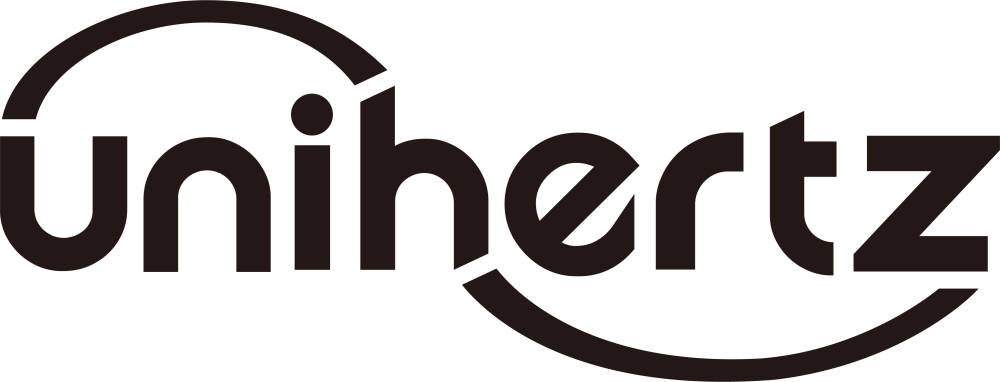

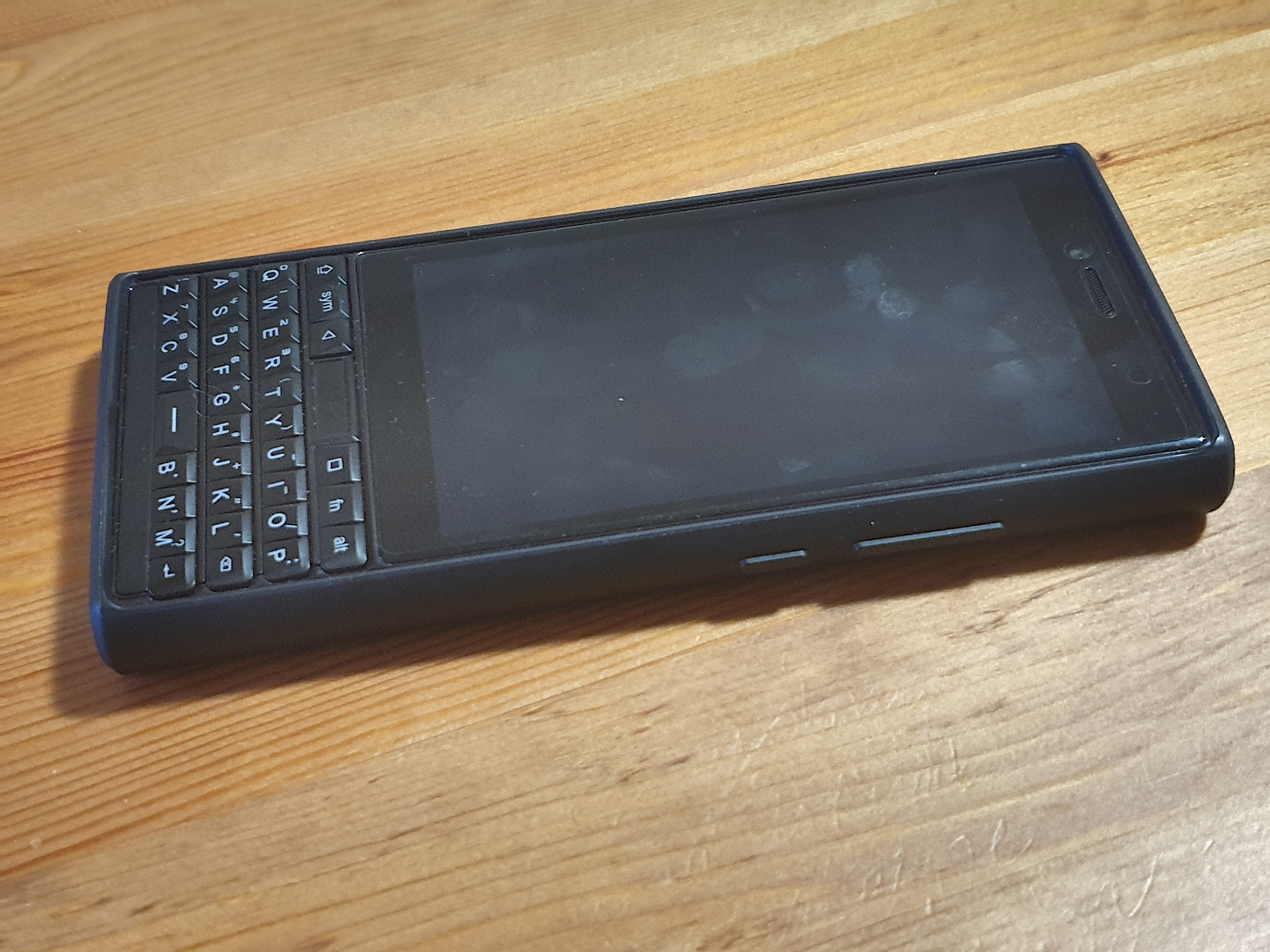
- A Unihertz Titan Slim model.
- Manufacturer: Unihertz
- Availability by region: 2019–present
- Predecessor: None
- Successor: Titan Pocket / Titan Slim / Titan 2
- Compatible networks: 2G, 3G, 4G and, on Titan 2 and Titan 2 Elite, 5G
- Form factor: Bar
- Dimensions: 146.8×67.6×12.7 mm (Slim) – 153.6×92.5×16.7 mm (Titan)
- Weight: 163–303 g (6–11 oz)
- Operating system: Android 9.0–16 (varies by model)
- Data inputs: QWERTY keyboard, capacitive touchscreen
- Development status: Active

The Unihertz Titan is a family of smartphones with physical QWERTY Thumb keyboards produced by the Chinese company Unihertz. The series began in July 2019 as a crowdfunded device and has since been expanded into several models. Although unrelated to BlackBerry devices, the Titan line has drawn interest from BlackBerry fans. Every Titan variant combines a hardware keyboard with either a square or narrow touchscreen and runs the Android operating system.

== History ==
Unihertz unveiled the original Titan through a Kickstarter campaign on 30 July 2019. The technology site PhoneArena reported that the project’s US$100,000 funding goal was met within minutes and that early backers were promised delivery by December 2019. The handset weighed about 303 g, measured almost 17 mm thick and paired an “ergonomically designed” keyboard with a 4.5‑inch 1:1 display (1,440 × 1,440 pixels). The Next Web described the prototype as using a MediaTek Helio P60 system‑on‑chip, 6 GB of RAM and 128 GB of storage, shipping with Android 9.0, and including a 6,000 mAh battery, USB‑C port and IP67 dust/water resistance.

In 2021 Unihertz introduced the Titan Pocket, a smaller handset with a 3.1‑inch 716 × 720 display and a Helio P70 processor. Forbes characterised it as a “throwback” measuring 5.22 × 2.88 × 0.66 inches (133 × 73 × 17 mm) and weighing 215 g, with 6 GB of RAM, 128 GB of storage, a 4,000 mAh battery and microSD expansion. The phone shipped with Android 11 and its keyboard offered trackpad-like scrolling as well as a programmable red side button. Reviewers praised its productivity features but found the small screen awkward for multimedia viewing.

A thinner variant, the Titan Slim, launched via Kickstarter in May 2022. Android Police reported that the Slim uses a MediaTek Helio P70 SoC with 6 GB of RAM and 256 GB of internal storage (without microSD), features a 4.2‑inch 768 × 1,280 LCD and a four‑row keyboard with an integrated fingerprint sensor, and runs Android 11. It includes a 48 MP rear camera, 8 MP front camera, dual‑SIM capability and a 4,100 mAh battery with 10 W charging, and weighs 204 g. Critics appreciated its protective accessories but criticised its small screen, lack of 5G support and outdated software.

The Titan 2 was announced in 2025 as Unihertz’s first 5G keyboard phone. TechRadar reported that the Titan 2 features a 4.5‑inch 1:1 display (1,440 × 1,440 pixels) supplemented by a 2‑inch rear display, dual programmable side buttons and a redesigned keyboard with capacitive gestures. Powered by a MediaTek Dimensity 7300 processor, the handset includes 12 GB of LPDDR5 RAM, 512 GB of UFS 3.1 storage, a 5,050 mAh battery with 33 W charging and dual nano‑SIM support. The camera array comprises a 50 MP main sensor, 8 MP telephoto lens and 32 MP front camera. Android Police reported that the phone weighs 235 g, measures 137.8 × 88.7 × 10.8 mm and runs Android 15, calling it “the best keyboard phone you can buy in 2025”.

== Models ==
=== Titan (2019) ===
The original Titan is a rugged Android smartphone with a square display and full QWERTY keyboard. According to The Next Web, it uses an octa‑core MediaTek Helio P60 paired with 6 GB of RAM and 128 GB of storage. It features a 4.5‑inch 1,440 × 1,440 pixel LCD, runs Android 9.0 and includes a 6,000 mAh battery, 16 MP rear camera, 8 MP front camera, NFC and IP67 certification. PhoneArena added that the device weighs roughly 303 g and was sold for around US$359.

=== Titan Pocket (2021) ===
The Titan Pocket shrinks the design to a 3.1‑inch 716 × 720 display while retaining the hardware keyboard. Forbes reported that it measures 5.22 × 2.88 × 0.66 inches (133 × 73 × 17 mm) and weighs 215 g. It uses a Helio P70 processor, with 6 GB of RAM and 128 GB of storage (expandable via microSD), and carries a 16 MP rear camera, 8 MP front camera and approximately 4,000 mAh battery. The device runs Android 11 and features a programmable side button and keyboard trackpad.

=== Titan Slim (2022) ===
Unveiled in mid‑2022, the Titan Slim offers a thinner candybar form factor. It is powered by a MediaTek Helio P70 with 6 GB of RAM and 256 GB of storage (no microSD), and features a 4.2‑inch 768 × 1,280 LCD and a four‑row keyboard with integrated fingerprint sensor. The phone has a 48 MP rear camera, 8 MP front camera, dual‑SIM slots and a 4,100 mAh battery with 10 W charging. It ships with Android 11, weighs 204 g and measures 146.85 × 67.6 × 12.75 mm.

=== Titan 2 (2025) ===
Announced in 2025, the Titan 2 is Unihertz’s first 5G QWERTY phone. It uses a MediaTek Dimensity 7300 processor with 12 GB of LPDDR5 RAM and 512 GB of UFS 3.1 storage. The handset combines a 4.5‑inch 1,440 × 1,440 display and a 2‑inch rear display and features a four‑row keyboard with capacitive swipe gestures and programmable keys. Other specifications include a 50 MP main camera, 8 MP telephoto lens, 32 MP front camera, 5,050 mAh battery with 33 W charging and dual nano‑SIM support. The device weighs 235 g, measures 137.8 × 88.7 × 10.8 mm and runs Android 15.

=== Titan 2 Elite (2026) ===
Announced in March 2026, the Titan 2 Elite comes in two versions: the standard model with a MediaTek Dimensity 7400 processor, 12 GB of LPDDR5 RAM and 256 GB of storage, and a Pro model with a Dimensity 8400, 12 GB of RAM and 512 GB of storage. Both versions have a 50 MP main camera and a 50 MP telephoto camera, and the Pro version also supports optical image stabilization. The Kickstarter campaign for both devices opened on 24 March 2026.

== Model comparison ==
| Model | Announce date | Display | Processor | Memory/storage | OS (launch) | Battery | Weight |
|---|---|---|---|---|---|---|---|
| Titan | 30 Jul 2019 (Kickstarter) | 4.5 in 1440×1440 LCD | Helio P60 | 6 GB RAM / 128 GB + microSD | Android 9.0 | 6,000 mAh | 303 g |
| Titan Pocket | 2021 | 3.1 in 716×720 LCD | Helio P70 | 6 GB RAM / 128 GB + microSD | Android 11 | ≈4,000 mAh | 215 g |
| Titan Slim | May 2022 | 4.2 in 768×1280 LCD | Helio P70 | 6 GB RAM / 256 GB (no microSD) | Android 11 | 4,100 mAh | 204 g |
| Titan 2 | 2025 (Kickstarter; shipping Oct 2025) | 4.5 in 1440×1440 main + 2 in rear LCD | Dimensity 7300 | 12 GB RAM / 512 GB (no microSD) | Android 15 | 5,050 mAh (33 W) | 235 g |
| Titan 2 Elite | March 2026 (Kickstarter) | 4.03 in 1080×1200 AMOLED | Dimensity 7400 | 12 GB RAM / 256 GB | Android 16 | 4,050 mAh | 163 g |
| Titan 2 Elite Pro | 2026 (Kickstarter; shipping Oct 2026) | 4.03 in 1080×1200 AMOLED | Dimensity 8400 | 12 GB RAM / 512 GB | Android 16 | 4,050 mAh (33 W) | 163 g |

== See also ==
- List of Android devices
- BlackBerry – discontinued line of smartphones with physical keyboards
- BlackBerry Passport
- Zinwa Q25 – BlackBerry Classic rebuilt with new internals and Android
