= Intel Unison =

Intel-developed software functionality

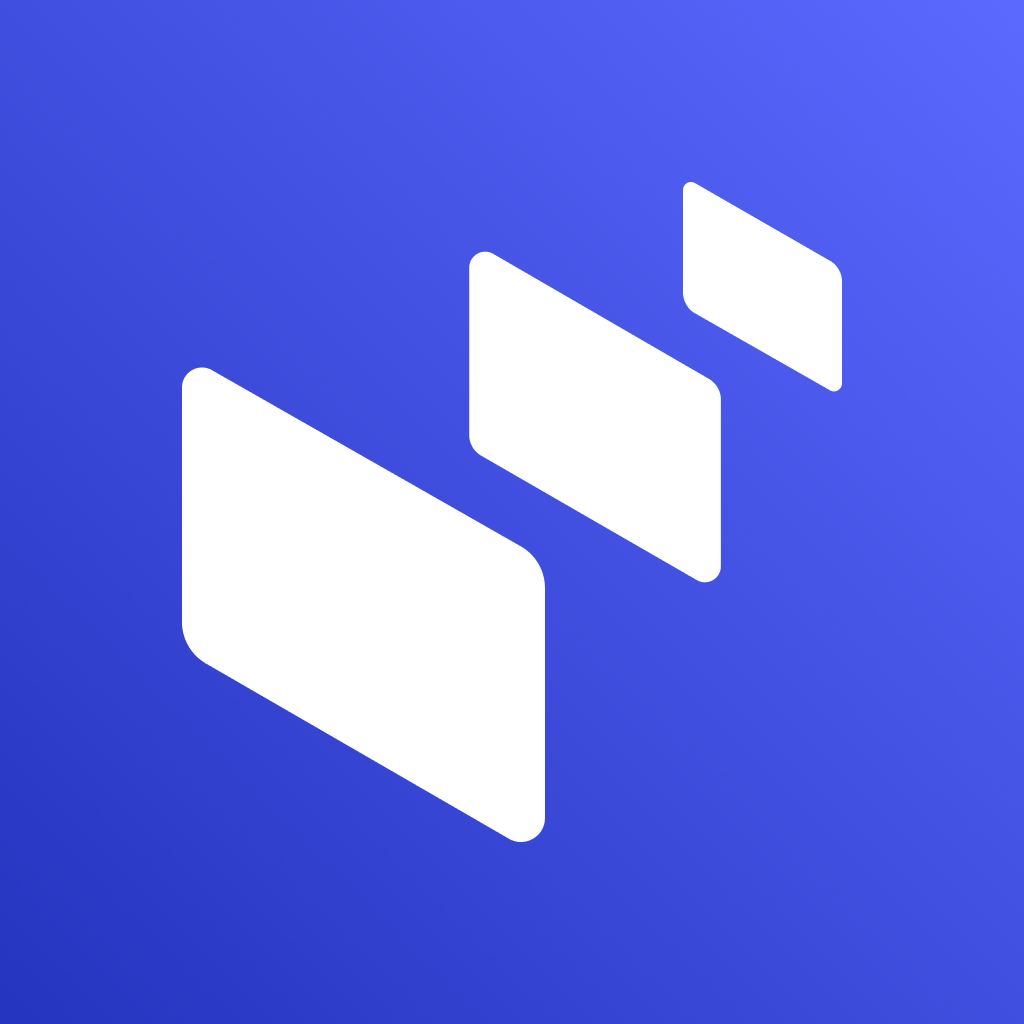
- Logo

- Intel Unison image gallery view
- Developer: Intel Corporation
- Initial release: March 22, 2022; 4 years ago (Windows); November 20, 2022; 3 years ago (iOS); December 5, 2022; 3 years ago (Android); Discontinued June 3, 2025
- Operating system: Android; iOS; Windows
- Available in: 19 languages (Windows)
- List of languages: Chinese (Simplified); Chinese (Traditional Chinese); English (United States); French; French (Canada); German; Indonesian; Italian; Japanese; Korean; Polish; Portuguese (Brazil); Russian; Spanish; Swedish; Thai; Turkish; Ukrainian; Vietnamese
- Type: Computer–telephone integration
- License: Proprietary
- As of: April 2, 2025

Intel Unison was a software functionality created by Intel for seamless integration between a personal computer and mobile device.

Unison was announced in September 2022 and launched broadly throughout 2023 12th generation Core processors, although some Intel Evo compliant computers had a preview version of it already. The feature allowed an Android or iOS device to pair with an Intel-powered PC, and be able to make and receive calls via the PC, send and receive texts, and receive and respond to notifications.

Intel also said that Unison would turn into a platform for any developer to take advantage of. Unison has been compared to a number of software such as Microsoft's Phone Link, Samsung Flow, KDE Connect, and Dell's Mobile Connect.

As of March 2025, Intel announced it would shut down the service in June of the same year. It was shut down on June 3, 2025.
