= Microsoft Phone =

Terms such as Microsoft phone and Microsoft phones may refer to:

- Windows Phone, a defunct family of mobile operating systems from Microsoft, successor to Windows Mobile
  - My Windows Phone, a user help service on said systems
- Windows Mobile, a defunct family of mobile operating systems from Microsoft
- Microsoft Mobile, a defunct Microsoft subsidiary that created actual mobile phones

== See also ==
- Microsoft
  - History of Microsoft
  - Microsoft mobile services
  - Overview of Microsoft hardware
