= My Windows Phone =

Companion service for Windows Phone devices

- My Windows Phone online portal
- Developer: Microsoft
- Release: October 21, 2010
- Stable release: 8.0 "Apollo" / October 29, 2012; 13 years ago
- Platform: Windows Phone
- Website: www.windowsphone.com/my

My Windows Phone (previously Windows Phone Live) was a free online companion service for Windows Phone mobile devices from Microsoft. The service, released in conjunction with the launch of Windows Phone 7 on October 21, 2010, provides users with a free mobile phone back-up solution by wirelessly synchronizing contacts, calendar appointments, photos, and OneNote notebooks with a various tightly integrated Windows Live services including Outlook.com People and Calendar, and Microsoft OneDrive. Users can access and manage their information stored on their Windows Phone devices via a password protected online portal using their Microsoft account. My Windows Phone also includes the Find My Phone service which facilitates tracking of a lost or stolen phone over the Internet or by messages. Similar phone finder services under various names are available for other families of smartphones. A similar service for Windows Mobile devices was available with Microsoft My Phone, withdrawn in 2011.

The service was updated on September 27, 2011 in conjunction with the release of Windows Phone 7.5 "Mango" update, adding support for Microsoft Scrapbook and account management features including viewing app purchase history and reinstall apps from the Windows Phone Store. With the Windows Phone 8 "Apollo" update, Microsoft has increased the age requirement for a separate Microsoft account from 13 to 18 and added the My Family feature to My Windows Phone, allowing parents to manage their child's accounts (including accounts with a birth date between 13-17 years of age prior to this update) running Windows Phone 8 (which was later incorporated in PCs running Windows 10). In February 2015 Microsoft moved the Find My Phone feature from the Windows Phone site to the Microsoft account website in preparation for Windows 10.

== Features ==
My Windows Phone offers the following features:

Feature	Description
My Phone	Contacts – Automatic synchronization of all contacts in the People hub to their Microsoft account, including contacts added from other connected services such as Facebook, Twitter, LinkedIn, and Sina Weibo.
My Phone	Calendar – Automatic synchronization of all calendar appointments and tasks with Outlook.com Calendar.
My Phone	Mail – Automatic synchronization of all emails with Outlook.com.
My Phone	OneDrive – Automatic synchronization of all Office documents, as well backup of any photos and videos taken on the phone onto on OneDrive. Users can also choose to share and collaboratively work on the notebooks with their contacts.
My Phone	Messages – Automatic synchronization and backup of all SMS and MMS messages onto the cloud. Any messages sent or received via Skype and Messenger are also backed up and accessible via Outlook.com.
My Phone	Settings – Automatic backup of the list of Windows Phone Store apps installed on the device (but not the app itself or any data associated with the app), as well as call history, theme color, accounts setup, Internet Explorer favorites, and other phone settings to the cloud.
Find My Phone	Map It – Presents the phone's current location on a map using either the phone's current GPS location data, or via the triangulation of mobile network towers.
Find My Phone	Ring It – Remotely rings the phone loudly for 60 seconds even if it is set to silent or vibrate mode.
Find My Phone	Lock It – Allows users to remotely lock a device and set a personal PIN from the Find My Phone portal. Users can also enter a "please return" message to be displayed on the locked screen.
Find My Phone	Erase It – Remotely erases the phone and resets it to factory default settings. The function will erase all personal data including all contacts, e-mails, applications, and application data.
My Family	Integrates with Microsoft Family Safety to allow users to manage their child's Microsoft accounts (with a birth date under 18, as well as any accounts with a birth date between 13-17 years of age prior to this update) on mobile devices running Windows Phone 8 (this does not apply to PCs until Windows 10 was released). This includes restricting the child's account to download apps from the Windows Phone Store, setting the game ratings for any games downloaded from the store, and accept any terms and conditions on the child's behalf.
Account and purchase history	Allow users to view their Windows Phone Store app purchase history and reinstall apps for their Windows Phone device. Users can also edit their Microsoft account's payment and billing information, as well as edit their preferred contacting email address.

== See also ==
- Windows Live
- My Phone
- Phone Link
