= Phone Link =

Software application developed by Microsoft

- A screenshot of the Phone Link interface opened in Windows, showing the Calls section
- Developer: Microsoft
- Release: October 2, 2018; 7 years ago

Stable release(s) [±]
- Windows: July 2026 Update (1.26072.255) / September 11, 2026; 14 days ago
- Android: 1.25102.140 / November 18, 2025; 10 months ago
- iOS: 1.26082.6 / September 8, 2026; 17 days ago
- Operating system: Windows 10, 11; Android; iOS 16+
- Predecessor: Phone Companion
- Type: Phone and PC driver
- License: Proprietary freeware
- Website: Phone Link

Phone Link, previously Your Phone, is a syncing software developed by Microsoft to connect Windows PCs to Android and iOS mobile devices to view notifications, make phone calls, and use mobile apps, and perform other actions on mobile devices, via the PC. It is a native component of Windows 10 (since version 1809) and Windows 11, where it is a UWP app and consists of a driver that communicates with the Link to Windows app on the mobile device. Phone Link makes use of Wi-Fi, Bluetooth for voice calls, or mobile data.

== Features ==
Phone Link enables a PC to send (and receive) text messages relayed from the mobile device, including both SMS and MMS (except images, video, and audio), as well as RCS for Samsung altogether using Samsung Messages. It can also access the 2000 most recent photos on the connected phone.

Audio that is played on the phone can also be controlled on the Phone Link interface, so long as the playing apps have media controls in the Android notification area.

Phone Link can also be used to mirror the screen of an Android device; however this feature is currently only available on select devices with the Link to Windows service pre-installed. The app also has a cross-device copy and paste feature allowing users to send copied text and images between devices using the same copy and paste shortcuts on each device.

It requires users to sign in with the same Microsoft account on both PC and phone to enable the functionality.

== History ==
At its Build 2018 event on May 7, 2018, Microsoft presented the Your Phone app, which allowed users to use their PCs to see recent photos on their Android based phones, and to send SMS messages. Your Phone was released as part of the Windows 10 October 2018 Update (1809), as a replacement of the legacy Phone Companion app.

At Samsung's Galaxy Note10 launch event, Microsoft previewed the additional Your Phone feature of receiving phone calls directly on a PC via Bluetooth. The feature was made available for all Android phones on February 20, 2020. At the same event it was revealed that Your Phone will ship on most Samsung Galaxy devices as part of a partnership with Samsung Electronics.

In March 2022, Your Phone was rebranded to Phone Link and the interface was changed. At the same time, the Your Phone Companion app on mobile was also renamed, to Link to Windows.

In April 2023, Microsoft started rolling out support for the iPhone on Windows 11 only.

== See also ==
- ActiveSync
- My Phone
- Quick Share
- Intel Unison
- Windows Mobile Device Center
- Windows Phone
