= Clicks Communicator =

2026 upcoming Android smartphone

- Developer: Clicks Technology
- Type: Smartphone
- First released: Q4 2026
- Compatible networks: 2G / 3G / 4G / 5G
- Form factor: Bar
- Colors: Smoke; Onyx; Clover
- Dimensions: 130.5 × 78.63 × 12 mm (5.138 × 3.096 × 0.472 in)
- Weight: 170 g (6.0 oz)
- Operating system: Android 17, up to 4 major Android upgrades
- System-on-chip: MediaTek MT8883
- Memory: 12 GB
- Storage: 256 GB
- Removable storage: microSD, up to 2 TB
- SIM: nanoSIM, eSIM
- Battery: 4,350 mAh Li-ion battery
- Rear camera: 50 MP, autofocus
- Front camera: 24 MP, fixed focus
- Display: 4.03 in (102 mm) AMOLED, 1080 x 1280 pixels, 1.18:1 aspect ratio, ~415 ppi
- Connectivity: Wi-fi 802.11 a/b/g/n/ac/6e, tri-band Bluetooth 5.4; 3.5mm Headphone jack USB Type-C
- Data inputs: QWERTY, QWERTZ, AZERTY, Korean, or Arabic keyboard Multi-touch screen Fingerprint scanner (within space bar); Barometer
- Website: clicksphone.com/communicator

The Clicks Communicator is an upcoming compact Android smartphone developed by Clicks Technology set to release in Q4 of 2026. Unveiled at the Consumer Electronics Show in January 2026, the device is designed as a communication-centric "companion phone" featuring an integrated physical keyboard.

== History ==
=== Development ===
The Clicks Communicator was developed by Clicks Technology, a startup co-founded by mobile journalists Michael Fisher (known as MrMobile) and Kevin Michaluk (founder of Crackberry). Following the company's 2024 launch of keyboard accessories for the iPhone, the Communicator was conceived as a standalone hardware solution for a "two-phone lifestyle." The design team included Joseph Hofer, a former lead designer at BlackBerry responsible for the keyboard ergonomics of the BlackBerry Bold 9900 and BlackBerry Passport.

=== Announcements ===
On February 27th, 2026, a press release from Clicks announced additional keyboard layout options for the Communicator, which included QWERTZ, AZERTY, Korean, and Arabic. In addition, Clicks confirmed the MediaTek Dimensity 8300 SoC which would be inside the device, using the MT8883 platform.

On April 27th, 2026, Clicks announced a Q4 2026 release window for the Communicator, as well as a planned battery capacity upgrade.

In late-May 2026, it was confirmed that the Communicator would launch with Android 17, after initially planning to launch with Android 16. Additionally, the listed battery capacity was updated to 4,450 mAh, up from 4,000 mAh.

A working prototype of the Communicator was demoed on June 29th, 2026, serving as an overview of the basic software experience, as well as confirming the presence of a barometer.

Updated specs for the Communicator were announced on September 18th, 2026, with a new RAM capacity of 12GB, claimed to be upgraded from 8GB. The battery architecture also switched from silicon-carbon to lithium-ion, with a new battery capacity of 4,350 mAh, claimed to be upgraded from 4,000 mAh despite a 4,450 mAh capacity being slated in an earlier announcement. The switch to lithium-ion was cited for safety concerns, after higher failure rates for the previous silicon-carbon battery were shown in third-party battery tests. A detailed demo of the Signal Light's functionality in development was also shown, along with the announcement of an on-device speech-to-text model.

== Hardware ==
The device features a portrait-oriented 4.03-inch AMOLED display with a resolution of 1080 x 1200 pixels. It is powered by a 4nm MediaTek 5G chipset, with 12GB of RAM, and includes 256GB of internal storage, expandable via microSD up to 2TB.

The primary input method is a backlit physical keyboard. The keyboard is capacitive, allowing users to scroll through interfaces by swiping across the physical keys, in addition to using the space bar's fingerprint sensor to unlock the device. Additional hardware includes:

- Signal Light: A side-mounted notification light integrated into the "Prompt Key" that can be color-coded for specific contacts or applications.
- Battery and Charging: A 4,350 mAh lithium-ion battery that supports 15W Qi2 wireless charging and USB-C, rated for more than 800 charging cycles.
- Connectivity: A 3.5mm headphone jack, physical SIM tray with eSIM support, and a physical privacy kill switch that can configured to enter do not disturb mode, airplane mode, or to turn off the signal light.

== Software ==
The Communicator runs a specialized version of Android 17. Clicks Technology partnered with the developers of Niagara Launcher to create a "Message Hub" interface. This software aggregates incoming communications from platforms such as WhatsApp, Signal, and Slack into a unified chronological feed on the home screen. The device supports hardware-backed encryption via the Android Strongbox API and is slated to receive four years of operating system updates and five years of security patches.
