= Find My Phone =

Software or service for locating smartphones

Find my Phone or similar is the name given by various manufacturers to software and a service for smartphones, whereby a registered user can find the approximate location of the phone if switched on, over the Internet, or by the phone sending e-mail or SMS text messages. This helps to locate lost or stolen phones.

Apple offers a free service called Find My for iPhones running iOS. Microsoft's My Windows Phone once offered a similar service for phones running Windows Phone. Similarly, Google offers Find Hub for phones running Android.

Some of these applications may have limitations which can be checked before installing, such as only working in some countries, dependencies upon the phone's implementation of GPS, etc. Similar paid or free apps are also available for all device platforms.

Similar applications are available for computers. Computers rarely have built-in GPS receivers or mobile telephone network connectivity, so these methods of location and signalling are not available. A computer connected to the Internet by a cabled connection gives its location as the location of the Internet service provider (ISP) it is connected to, usually a long distance away and not very useful, although the IP address may help. However, a WiFi-connected computer (typically a laptop computer) can find its approximate location by checking WiFi networks in range against a database, allowing approximate location to be determined and signalled over the Internet.
