= Minimal Phone =

Minimalist mobile phone

The Minimal Phone is a minimalist mobile phone. It is an Android phone with an E Ink display and a QWERTY Thumb keyboard. It is a product of The Minimal Company, a consumer electronics company founded in 2023 that is based in Southern California.
