= Windows Mobile Device Center =

Synchronization software program

- The Windows Mobile Device Center in Windows Vista
- Developer(s): Microsoft
- Operating system: Microsoft Windows Vista; Microsoft Windows 7
- Predecessor: Microsoft ActiveSync
- Successor: Zune Software for Windows Phone 7
- Website: www.microsoft.com/windowsmobile/devicecenter.mspx (Archived)

Windows Mobile Device Center is a synchronization software program developed by Microsoft, and the successor to ActiveSync. It is designed to synchronize various content including music, video, contacts, calendar events, web browser favorites, and other files between Windows Mobile devices and the Microsoft Windows operating system.

== History ==
Windows Mobile Device Center was written as a successor to the ActiveSync program that was previously used to synchronize Windows CE based devices with Windows operating systems prior to Windows Vista. The first public release was available in October 2006 as a beta version meant for use with Windows Vista RC1. In February 2007, the first official release was made available for download, and in June 2007, Windows Mobile Device Center was updated to work with the Windows Mobile 6 operating system. With the release of Windows Mobile Device Center, Pocket PC 2000 and Pocket PC 2002 operating systems were effectively phased out of full native support with Windows Vista. However, basic connectivity became available for these devices with the 6.1 version release.

Other versions of Windows, such as Windows Server 2008 and Windows Server 2008 R2 can also be WMDC enabled.

== Features ==
While Windows Vista has a base driver built-in to interface with Windows Mobile devices in Windows Explorer, Windows Mobile Device Center offers a front-end for users to integrate their data in multiple Windows applications.

The base driver in Windows Vista allows browsing the device, copying files and syncing with Windows Media Player. For complete functionality including synchronization of tasks, calendar data, contacts, email etc. with Microsoft Office Outlook, Windows Mobile Device Center needs to be downloaded, which includes the additional drivers as well. Synchronization with Windows Mail, Windows Calendar, Windows Contacts, Outlook Express, Outlook 2010 x64 and any version of Outlook prior to Outlook 2003 is not supported. Whenever a Windows Mobile device is connected, the Mobile Device Center pane pops up giving options to manage media and other files on the device, as well as control their settings.

Ways to interface Windows Mobile devices with Windows Mobile Device Center include Bluetooth, USB, and for legacy purposes, Serial. However, synchronizing via the serial port is not activated by default, and it is required that the user alters the Windows Registry to do so.

Visual Studio 2005 and 2008 came with Remote Tools, that could be used to edit the registry of a tethered mobile device, and view the running processes. These Remote Tools utilised the ActiveSync Service, part of Windows Mobile Device Center

Windows Mobile Device Center 6.1 had the ability to synchronize the following:

- PIM information with Microsoft Outlook 2003 and later
- Photos with Windows Photo Gallery
- Videos with Windows Media Player
- Music with Windows Media Player
- Tasks and Calendar Events, Synced to Microsoft Outlook 2007
- Favorites with Internet Explorer
- Folders/General files with Windows Explorer
- OneNote Notes taken with OneNote Mobile
- Windows Mobile programs and version updates

== Major version releases ==
- Windows Mobile Device Center Beta 3, released on October 6, 2006. (First public release)
- Windows Mobile Device Center 6.0, released on February 1, 2007. (First official release, Outlook 2002 supported.)
- Windows Mobile Device Center 6.1, released in June 2007. (Added support for Windows Mobile 6 devices, added Windows 7 support, removed Outlook 2002 support.)

== See also ==
- ActiveSync
- Features new to Windows Vista
- Phone Companion
- Phone Link
- Pocket PC
- SyncML
- Zune Software
- Windows Mobile
- Windows Mobility Center
