= Unihertz Jelly series =

Series of compact Android smartphones

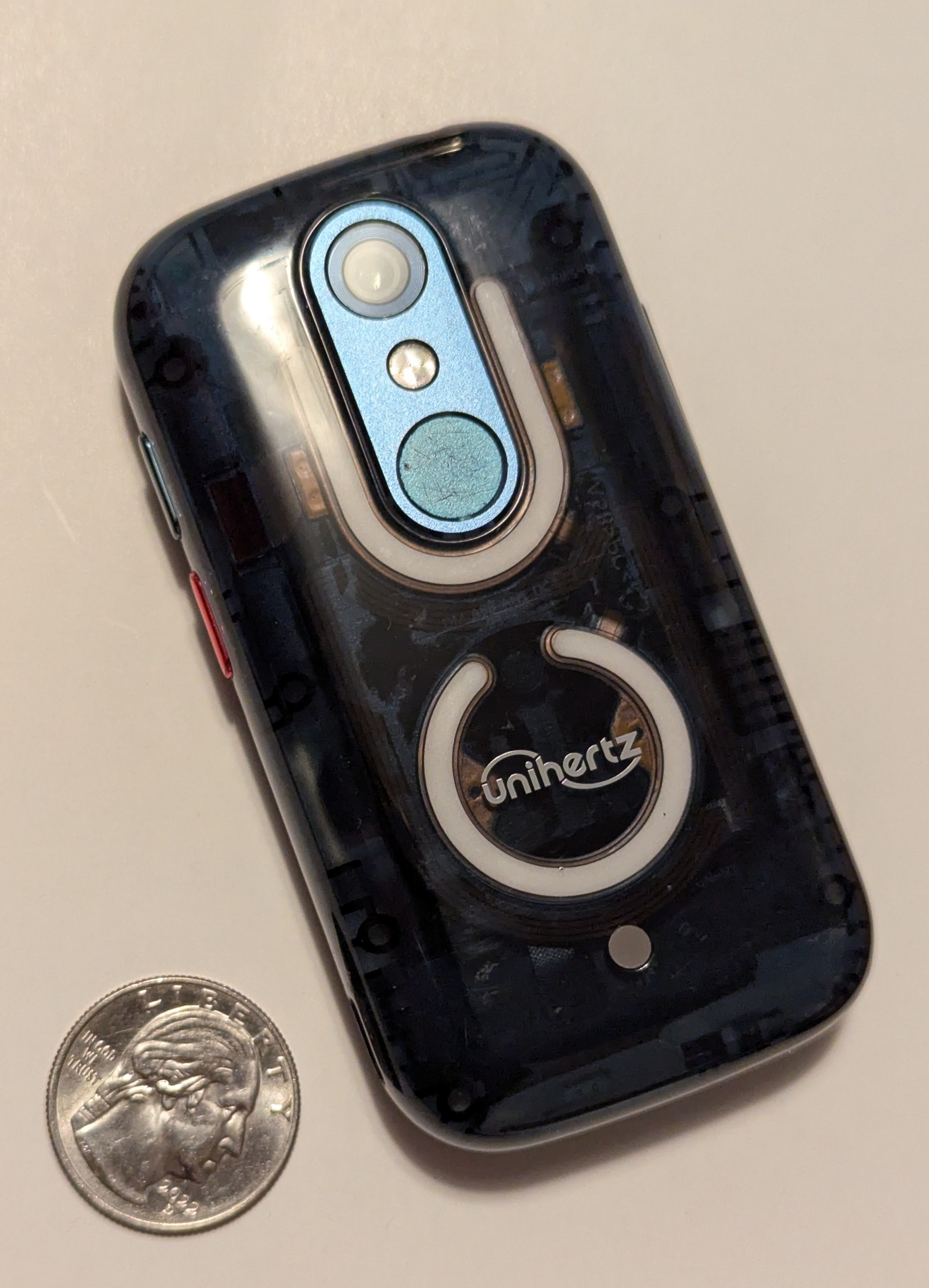
Transparent blue Jelly Star with an US-American coin for scale

The Unihertz Jelly is a series of compact Android smartphones developed by Unihertz. The line is characterized by its unique tiny-sized smartphones. It debuted in 2017 with the original Unihertz Jelly and Jelly Pro, which were marketed as "the smallest 4G smartphones" available at the time. Since then, Unihertz has released several successors and variants, the Jelly 2, Jelly Star, and Jelly Max. The Jelly Max has been marketed as the "world's smallest 5G phone."

As well as its unusual form compared to typical smartphones, the Jelly series has also attracted attention as a means of reducing problematic smartphone use. Reviews mention that the small display makes it less comfortable to use for games or extended scrolling, while still having full functionality as a smartphone.

The Jelly phones also have an additional programmable button in addition to the standard power and volume switches.

== History ==
The original Unihertz Jelly was initially developed through a successful Kickstarter campaign in 2017, which reached its US$30,000 funding goal within 57 minutes and ultimately raised over US$1.25 million.

Following the campaign's success, Unihertz continued developing new Jelly-branded devices, releasing updated models with newer processors, larger displays, and later-generation cellular support.

Unihertz was associated with a previous very small 3G smartphone, the Posh Micro X, which launched in 2015.

== Models ==
=== Jelly and Jelly Pro (2017) ===
The original Unihertz Jelly and the enhanced Jelly Pro were released in 2017. Both devices featured a 2.45-inch display, ran Android 7.0, and supported 4G LTE networks in a device weighing approximately 60 grams. The Jelly Pro offered increased RAM and storage compared to the base model.

Reviews of Jelly and Jelly Pro were mixed, but it drew international attention. There have been accusations of poor battery performance, and network traffic possibly sending personal data to China. Responses claim the network traffic is to speed up apps, and the company has been updating the phone software to improve performance. However, others have disputed this claim. It has received mixed reviews, with some critics calling it "innovative", praising it for its capabilities at such a small size.

=== Jelly 2 (2020) ===
In 2020, Unihertz released the Jelly 2, which introduced a slightly larger display and updated internal hardware.

=== Jelly Star ===
The Jelly Star was introduced in 2023 as an updated version, and was recognized as one of Time magazine’s Best Inventions of 2025.

=== Jelly Max ===
The Jelly Max is the first model to incorporate 5G connectivity, as well as being larger, with a five-inch screen, compared to the previous 3-inch screens. It was positioned as the "world’s smallest 5G smartphone" at the time of its announcement.

== Specifications ==
	Jelly/Jelly Pro	Jelly 2	Jelly 2e	Jelly Star	Jelly Max
Release	2017	2020	2022	2023	2024
Operating System (at release)	Android 8.1 (Android 7)	Android 11 (Android 10)	Android 12	Android 16 (Android 13)	Android 15 (Android 14)
Processor	Mediatek MT6737T Quad-core, 1.1 GHz	Helio P60 Octa-Core, 2.0 GHz	Helio A20 Quad-core, 1.8 GHz	Helio G99 Octa-core, 2.0–2.2 GHz	Dimensity 7300 Octa-core, 2.0–2.6 GHz
Storage	32 GB + microSD	128 GB UFS 2.1 + microSD	64 GB eMMC + microSD	256 GB UFS 2.2 + microSD	256 GB UFS 3.1 + microSD
RAM	1/2 GB	6 GB	4 GB	8 GB	12 GB
Sensors	G-Sensor, Compass, Gyroscope, Proximity	G-Sensor, Compass, Gyroscope, Proximity, Ambient Light, Fingerprint	G-Sensor, Compass, Gyroscope, Proximity, Ambient Light, Fingerprint	G-Sensor, Compass, Gyroscope, Proximity, Ambient Light, Fingerprint	G-Sensor, Compass, Gyroscope, Proximity, Ambient Light, Fingerprint
Connectivity	4G LTE Bluetooth 4.2; WLAN 802.11 b/g/n (2.4 GHz), dual Nano-SIM	2G / 3G / 4G LTE, Bluetooth 5.1, WLAN 802.11 a/b/g/n/ac (2.4/5 GHz), Dual Nano-SIM; NFC	2G / 3G / 4G LTE, Bluetooth 5.2, WLAN 802.11 a/b/g/n/ac (2.4/5 GHz), Dual Nano-SIM	2G / 3G / 4G LTE, Bluetooth 5.3, WLAN 802.11 a/b/g/n/ac (2.4/5 GHz), Dual Nano-SIM; NFC	2G / 3G / 4G LTE / 5G NR, Bluetooth 5.4, WLAN 802.11 a/b/g/n/ac/ax (2.4/5 GHz), Dual Nano-SIM; NFC
Display	2.45" TFT LCD; 432×240	3.0" LCD; 480×854	3.0" LCD; 480×854	3.0" LCD; 480×854	5.05" LCD; 720×1520
Rear camera	8 MP	16 MP AF	16 MP AF	48 MP AF	100 MP main + 8 MP telephoto
Front camera	2 MP	8 MP FF	8 MP FF	8 MP FF	32 MP
Battery	950 mAh removable battery	2000 mAh non-removable	2000 mAh non-removable	2000 mAh non-removable	4000 mAh non-removable
SIM	Removable Dual Nano-SIM	Dual Nano-SIM (hybrid)	Dual Nano-SIM (hybrid)	Dual Nano-SIM (hybrid)	Dual Nano-SIM (hybrid)
Size	92.4 × 43 × 13 mm	95 × 49.4 × 16.5 mm	95 × 49.4 × 16.5 mm	95.1 × 49.6 × 18.7 mm	128.7 × 62.7 × 16.3 mm
Weight	60 grams	106.5 g	110 g	116 g	180 g
Colors	White, Blue, Black	Dark Green	Silver	Red, Blue, Black	Black
