= Unihertz =

Chinese specialty smartphone manufacturer

Unihertz E-Commerce Co., Ltd.
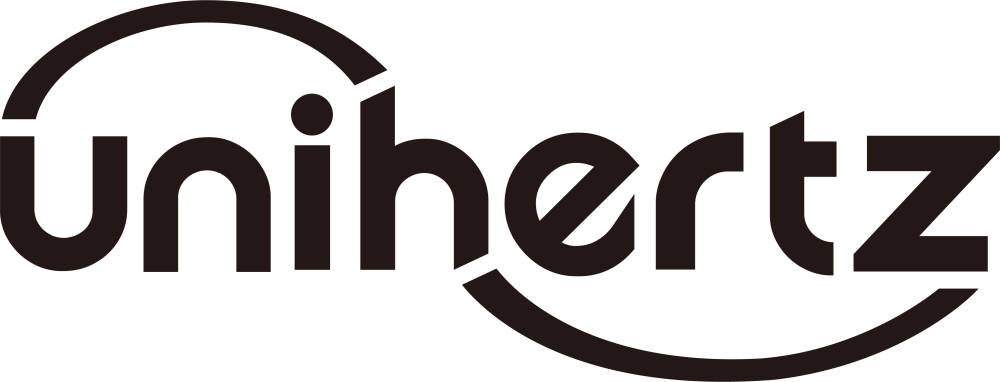
- Trade name: Unihertz
- Industry: Consumer electronics
- Founded: 2016; 10 years ago
- Founder: Stephen Xu (CEO)
- Headquarters: Shanghai, China
- Area served: Worldwide
- Products: Smartphones
- Website: unihertz.com

Unihertz is a Chinese smartphone manufacturer headquartered in Shanghai, China. The company makes mobile devices running Android OS, targeted at niche audiences utilizing design features such as retro-styled QWERTY keyboards, small form factors, rugged outdoor devices, and others. Unihertz initially gained recognition on the Kickstarter platform where its first project was the miniature smartphone named Unihertz Jelly in 2017.

== Company ==
Unihertz was founded as Unihertz E-Commerce Co., Ltd. in 2016, by Stephen Xu (CEO). Unihertz was granted a United States Patent and Trademark Office (USPTO) trademark on October 4, 2016, a European Union Intellectual Property Office (EUIPO) trademark on July 28, 2016, and a US patent on December 25, 2018.

== Crowdfunding smartphones ==
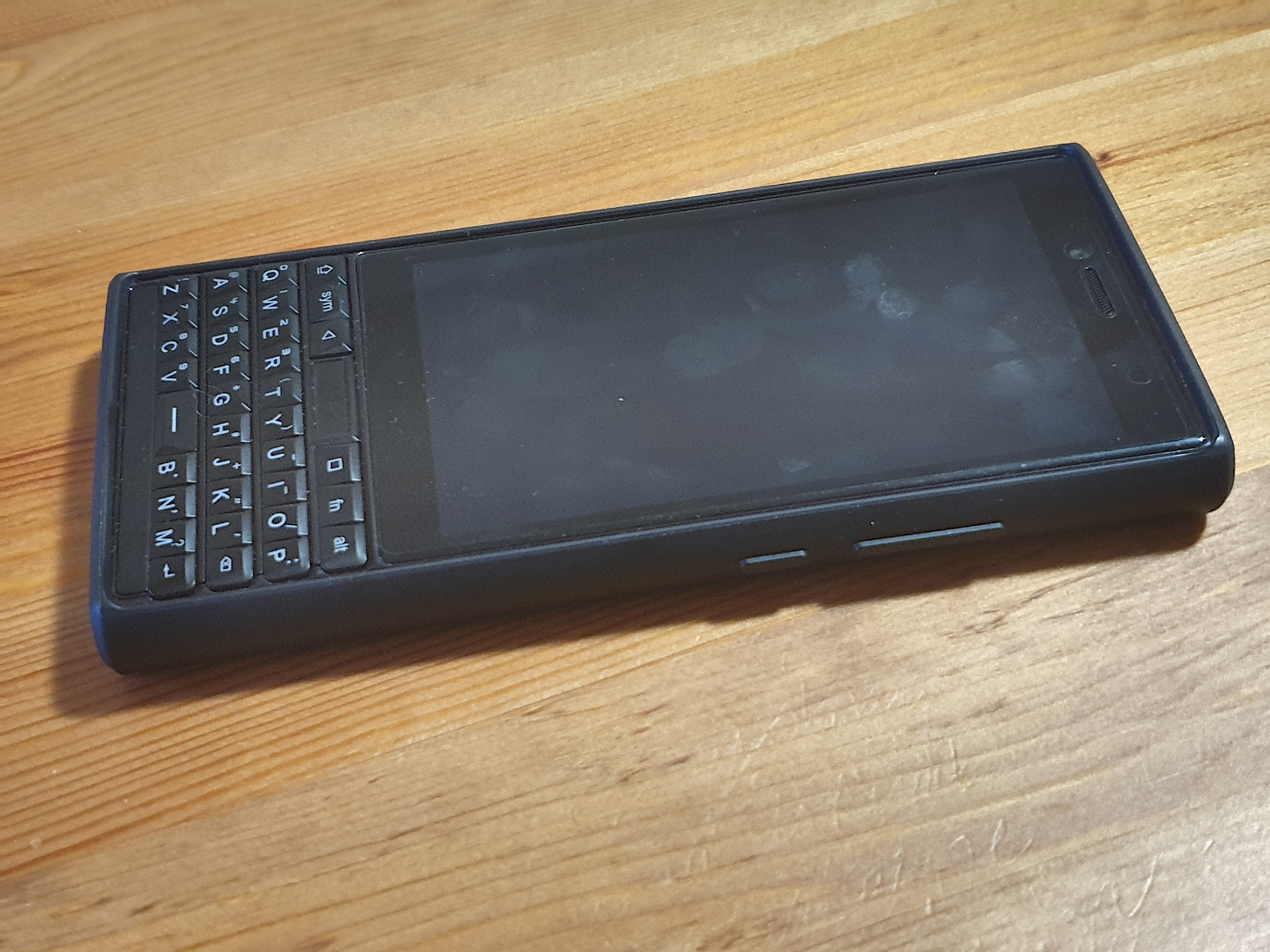
Unihertz Titan Slim

Unihertz gained attention in 2017 with the launch of its first crowdfunding project for a credit card sized Android smartphone named Unihertz Jelly, with the Kickstarter project achieving its goal of $30,000 in under an hour, ultimately obtaining US$1.25 million. Another Kickstarter campaign was created to raise funds for the Unihertz Atom, a similarly sized device with a more rugged design. In 2019 Unihertz launched Titan, which features a physical QWERTY keyboard.

Since then, Unihertz has launched several crowdfunding projects for subsequent models including Atom XL – DMR Walkie-Talkie rugged smartphone with a 4-inch display, Jelly 2 – a full-featured small smartphone with a 3-inch display, Titan Pocket – a compact QWERTY keyboard smartphone, TickTock – a 5G rugged phone with dual-screen, Titan Slim – a variation of the original Titan, Jelly Star – the world's smallest Android 13 smartphone, Jelly Max – the world's smallest 5G smartphone, and Titan 2 (branded as TiTAN) - Their second generation of QWERTY keyboard equipped smartphones.

Model	Main features	Crowdfunding achievement	Release time
Jelly/ Jelly Pro	Unihertz's first project on Kickstarter. It was then the smallest 4G smartphone (2.45-inch screen display). It runs Android 7.0, which was later upgraded to Android 8.1 Oreo. The smartphone was also released on Indiegogo.	US$1.25M 10,964 backers	2017
Atom	The rugged version of Jelly, which is called the world's smallest 4G rugged smartphone. Atom is an IP68 certified smartphone with a small screen of the same size as Jelly. It runs Android 8.1 Oreo when first release and later get upgraded to Android 9 Pie. Atom has a better battery capability (2000mAh).	US$1.29M 5,310 backers	2018
Titan	Titan was Unihertz's first try on the QWERTY smartphone of Android version. It is also an IP67-rated rugged smartphone with a large battery capacity (6000mAh). The smartphone originally runs Android 9 and get upgraded to Android 10 Quince Tart.	US$ 776K 3,085 backers	2019
Atom XL/L	Atom XL and Atom L are the upgraded version of Atom, with a larger 4-inch screen size, and a 4300mAh battery. The only difference between XL and L lies in the presence of the walkie-talkie function. The smartphone runs Android 10 and then get upgraded to Android 11 Red Velvet Cake.	US$ 568K 2,341 backers	2020
Jelly 2	Jelly 2 is the successor of the first generation Jelly. It runs Android 10 and has a 2,000mAh battery capacity. Its latest Android OS released by the firm is Android 11.	US$ 979K 5,343 backers	2020
Titan Pocket	Titan Pocket is an Android QWERTY smartphone, smaller than the company's previous QWERTY model and is equipped with Android 11.	US$ 794K 3,425 backers	2021
TickTock	TickTock is a 5G rugged smartphone with a large 6000mAh battery, featuring a unique dual screen design and runs Android 11.	US$ 184K 608 Backers	2022
Titan Slim	The Titan Slim adopts a rectangular screen and is sleeker and slimmer than its previous QWERTY models. It is powered by Android 11 and equipped with a 4100mAh battery.	US$ 589K 2,281 Backers	2022
Jelly Star	A tiny smartphone with a transparent back panel, dynamic LED lighting, and advanced features packed into a credit card sized body, which is powered by Android 13 system.	US$ 553K 2,281 Backers	2023
Jelly Max	Claimed by Unihertz to be the world's smallest 5G smartphone.	US$ 380K 1,471 Backers	2024
Titan 2	Android 15 Phone with a Physical QWERTY Keyboard.	US$2,08M 7,019 Backers	2025
Titan 2 Elite / Pro	Android 16 phone with physical QWERTY keyboard and 5G network.		2026

== Other smartphones ==
Unihertz owns a self-operated smartphone manufacturing plant with a complete production line. In addition to their main featured product lines, the company also releases other unique devices on their official website. Examples include the Tank series and Luna. Tank series is a lineup of ruggedised mobile phones with unique features like compact 4.3-Inch display, large-capacity battery, projector function and laser rangefinder.
