= Zinwa Q25 =

2025 smartphone built from BlackBerry Classic hardware

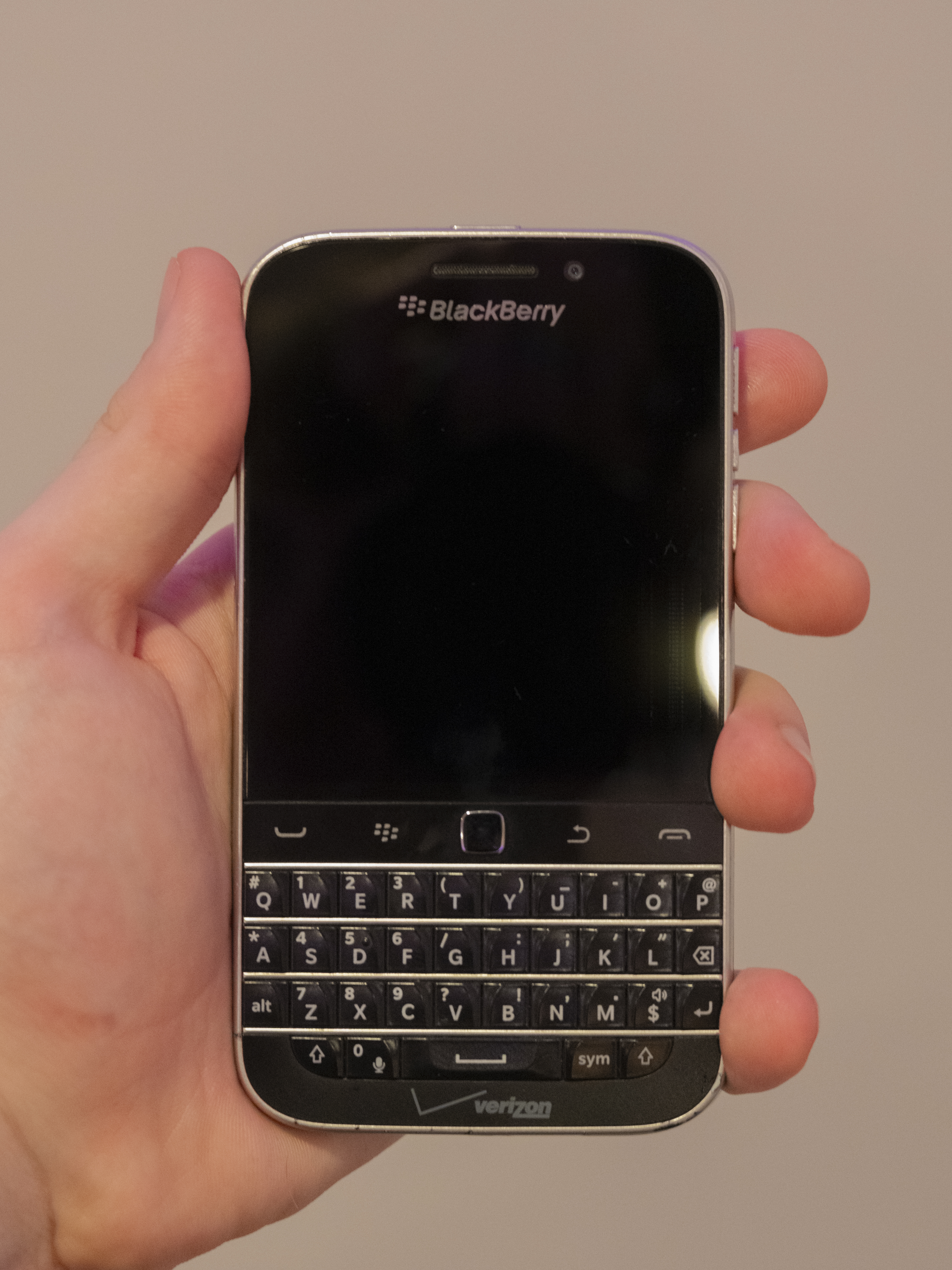
- The Zinwa Q25 shares the chassis of the original BlackBerry Classic.
- Brand: Zinwa
- Manufacturer: Zinwa Technologies
- Type: Smartphone
- Series: Q-series
- First released: 2025
- Predecessor: BlackBerry Classic (hardware basis)
- Form factor: Bar
- Dimensions: 131 mm (5.2 in) H 72.4 mm (2.85 in) W 10.2 mm (0.40 in) D
- Weight: Approx. 178 g (6.28 oz)
- System-on-chip: MediaTek Helio G99
- CPU: Octa-core
- GPU: Mali-G57 MC2
- Memory: 12 GB LPDDR4x
- Storage: 256 GB UFS 2.x
- Removable storage: microSDXC
- Battery: 3000 mAh
- Rear camera: 50 MP
- Front camera: 8 MP
- Display: 3.5 in 720×720 IPS LCD, 1:1 aspect ratio
- Connectivity: 4G LTE, Wi-Fi, Bluetooth, NFC, USB-C, 3.5 mm audio jack
- Data inputs: QWERTY keyboard, touchscreen, trackpad
- Website: zinwa.com

Zinwa Q25 (also marketed as Q25 Pro) is an Android smartphone developed by the Chinese company Zinwa Technologies in 2025. The device is a modified version of the BlackBerry Classic (2014), replacing its internals with newer components. Intended both as a completed handset and as a conversion kit for existing BlackBerry Classic devices, the Q25 retains the original BlackBerry's 3.5-inch 720×720 touchscreen, QWERTY keyboard, trackpad and LED notification light but adds a 4G-capable MediaTek Helio G99 system on chip, 12 GB of RAM, 256 GB of storage, a 50 MP rear camera, NFC and USB-C, and runs on Android 13.

== Development and concept ==
According to an interview with the YouTube channel Returning Retro, the company's founder, who goes by the handle Zinwa, grew up using BlackBerry handsets and never took to glass-only smartphones. Realising that countless BlackBerry Classic housings were languishing in drawers or heading for e‑waste dumps, the founder designed a modern motherboard that would slot into the Q20's existing shell. By reusing the chassis, the company avoided the high tooling costs of a new enclosure and kept the familiar hardware features that made the Classic popular, such as the physical keyboard, trackpad and headphone jack. The prototype, shown on Returning Retro, maintains the Classic's footprint while supporting NFC, USB-C, a headphone jack, MicroSD card support, and a single SIM slot, and the modem supports all global 4G LTE bands.

== Hardware specifications ==
The Q25 uses a custom motherboard based on the MediaTek Helio G99 system‑on‑chip with an octa‑core CPU and Mali‑G57 MC2 GPU. It ships with 12 GB of LPDDR4x RAM and 256 GB of UFS 2.x internal storage, expandable via a microSDXC slot. The display is the original BlackBerry Classic 3.5‑inch (8.9 cm) 720×720 pixel IPS panel with a 1:1 aspect ratio. It retains the Q20's backlit QWERTY keyboard and capacitive trackpad; the trackpad functions as either a cursor or directional pad depending on user preference. A 50‑megapixel rear camera and an 8‑megapixel front‑facing camera replace the Classic's original sensors. The onboard 3,000 mAh battery is larger than the original and is charged via a USB‑C port; the device also features a headphone jack, single nano‑SIM slot, NFC support, Bluetooth, Wi‑Fi and 4G LTE connectivity, but it does not support 5G.

== Software ==
Unlike the 2014 BlackBerry Classic, which ran BlackBerry 10, the Q25 ships with what Ubergizmo described as "a minimal version of Android 13", although SlashGear reported it running Android 14. Ubergizmo reported that Zinwa had no confirmed plans for future software updates unless strong consumer interest drove further development, and SlashGear likewise noted that the company was not making any promises about software updates. The Q25 is also supported by third-party operating systems, including LineageOS and Ubuntu Touch, which listed the Q25 as a supported device in its 24.04-2.0 release.

== Release and availability ==
Zinwa announced the Q25 project in mid‑2025 and began accepting pre‑orders later that summer. The company offers two products: a ready‑built Q25 handset and a Q25 conversion kit for owners of the BlackBerry Classic who wish to retrofit their own devices. The assembled phone is priced at roughly US$400 while the kit costs about US$300. MobileSyrup later reported prices of US$420 for the complete phone and US$320 for the kit. Ubergizmo reported that the do‑it‑yourself kit costs around US$320 and that the first 100 complete devices were scheduled to ship by the end of August 2025, with mass production targeted for mid‑September. The company also sells replacement modules such as camera boards and batteries.

== Reception ==
Early coverage of the Q25 focused on its blend of nostalgia and modern hardware. NotebookCheck and other commentators noted that the device retained the Classic's signature form factor while offering contemporary specifications like a Helio G99 chipset, 12 GB RAM and a 50 MP camera. Commentators also highlighted the inclusion of a headphone jack, NFC and USB‑C, features that many modern flagship phones have abandoned. Ubergizmo and SlashGear both noted that the device lacks 5G support, and SlashGear added that Zinwa was making no promises about software updates.

== Successor and related devices ==
During the Q25's announcement, Zinwa Technologies confirmed that it was working on similar projects based on other BlackBerry models. Notebookcheck reported that a similar project based on the BlackBerry Passport was planned, to be sold as the Zinwa P25 or P26 depending on the year it became available.

== See also ==
- BlackBerry Classic
- Unihertz Titan – line of Android smartphones with physical keyboards
- Fairphone – a sustainable modular smartphone
