= KDE Connect =

Synchronisation app for KDE desktop environment

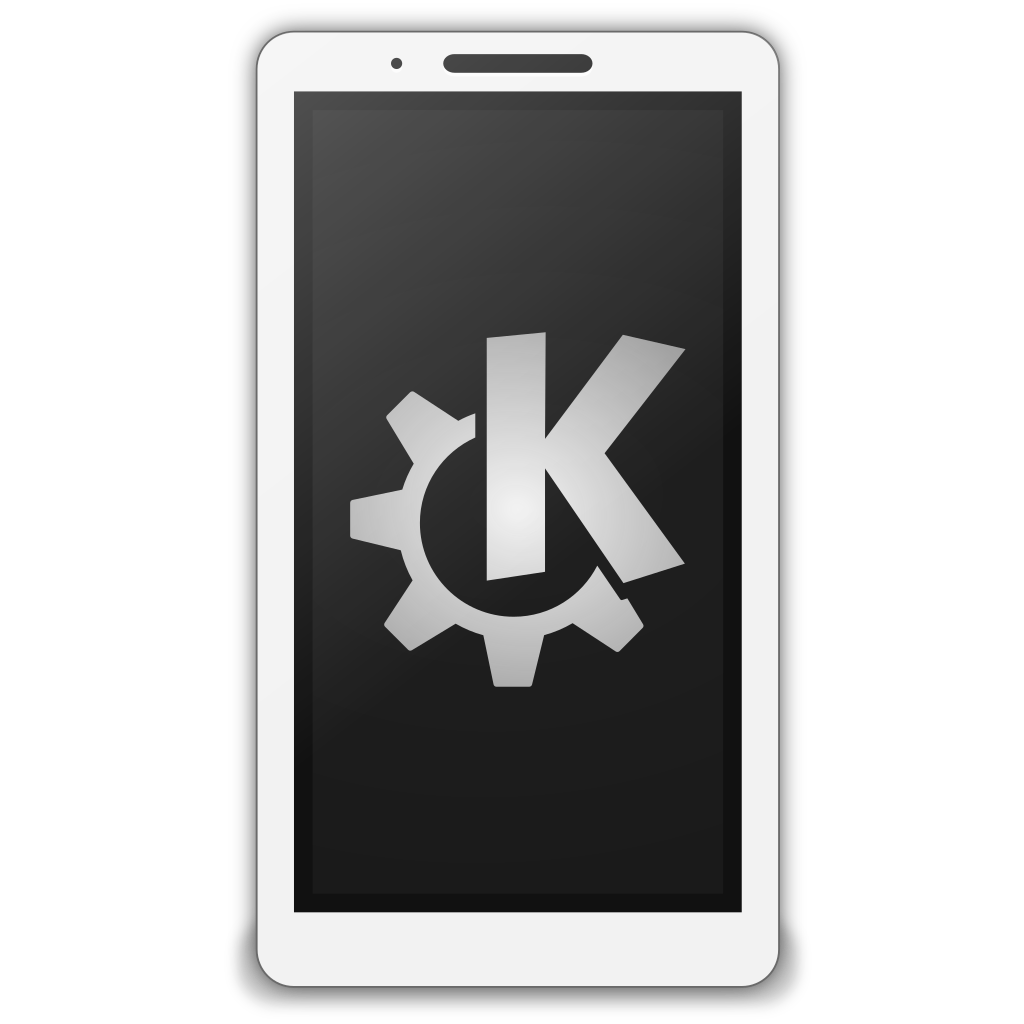

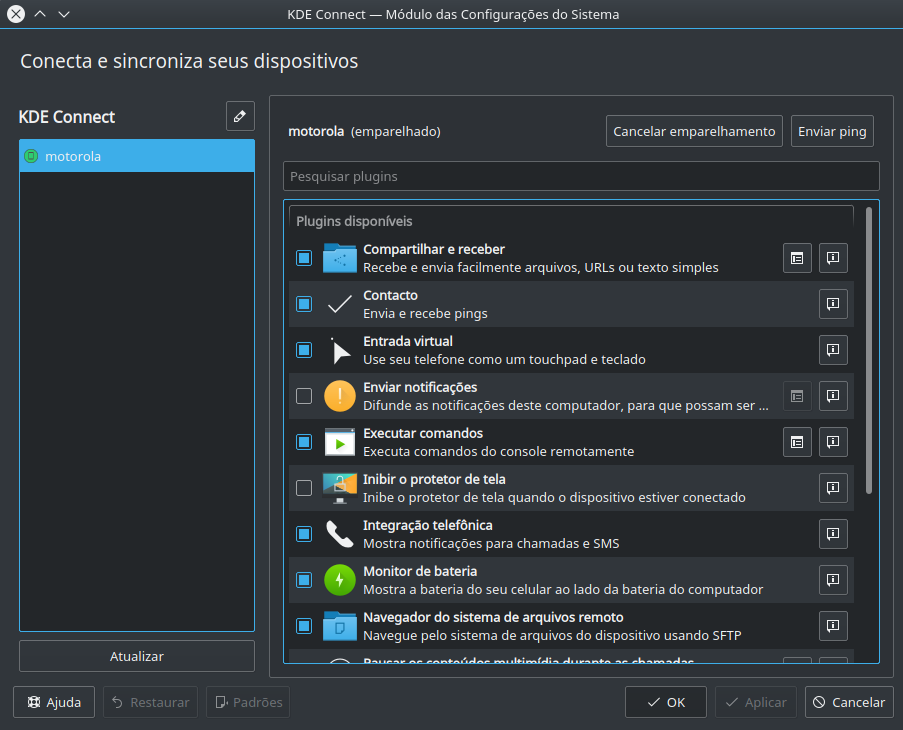
- Developer: KDE
- Release: 2013; 13 years ago

Stable release(s)
- KDE: 26.04.0 / 10 April 2026
- Android: 1.33.9 / 12 October 2025
- iOS: 0.4.3 / 25 January 2025
- Written in: C++
- Operating system: Linux, macOS, Windows, Android, iOS, Sailfish OS
- License: LGPL, GPL
- Website: kdeconnect.kde.org
- Repository: invent.kde.org/network/kdeconnect-kde

KDE Connect is a multi-platform application developed by KDE, which facilitates wireless communications and data transfer between devices over local networks. KDE Connect is available in the repositories of many Linux distributions, as well as F-Droid and Google Play Store for Android. Often, distributions bundle KDE Connect in their KDE Plasma desktop variant. KDE Connect has been reimplemented in the GNOME desktop environment as GSConnect, which can be obtained from GNOME Extension Store. Since 2021, KDE Connect has also been available on Windows, and it is available as an unstable nightly build on macOS.

Zorin OS has a project based on KDE Connect called Zorin Connect.

== Mechanism ==
KDE Connect is built around a UI-agnostic "core" library that exposes various D-Bus interfaces. This allows the software to be implemented on various operating systems by adding relevant UI components without having to reimplement its core mechanisms.

== Features ==
- Shared clipboard: copy and paste between a phone, a computer, any other device
- Notification sync: Read and reply to Android notifications from the desktop
- Share files and URLs instantly from one device to another, including some file system integration
- Multimedia remote control: Use a phone as the remote for Linux media players
- Virtual touchpad: Use a phone's screen as a touchpad and keyboard
- Presentation remote: Advance presentation slides using a phone

== Encryption ==
KDE Connect uses Transport Layer Security (TLS) encryption protocol for communication and SFTP to mount devices and send files.
