= My Phone =

Microsoft mobile service

- Developer: Microsoft
- Release: February 16, 2009
- Stable release: 01.05.2128.0401 / October 6, 2009; 16 years ago
- Operating system: Windows Mobile 6 or greater
- Type: Internet service
- Website: myphone.microsoft.com

My Phone was a Microsoft online service with a companion mobile client application for phones using the Windows Mobile 6 operating system, available from 2009 to 2011. It provided a free mobile phone back-up solution by wirelessly synchronizing contacts, calendar appointments, tasks, text messages, browser favorites, photos, music, video and documents with a password-protected online portal where users could access and manage their information. The service also enabled photo sharing and, in some markets, a set of features for dealing with a lost phone that were sold as a Premium Package requiring a one-time fee. My Phone supported Windows Mobile OS versions 6.0, 6.1 and 6.5 and was available globally in 25 languages. The service used Windows Live ID for authentication and the Windows Live server infrastructure for storing user information. The service was discontinued on August 7, 2011; data (contacts, calendar entries, text messages, and photos) was moved to SkyDrive, later renamed OneDrive.

== My Phone free features ==
The service offered the following free features:

Feature	Description
Data Types	My Phone synchronized contacts, calendar appointments, tasks, text messages and browser favorites.
Back-up/Restore	Data synchronized with My Phone could be restored or migrated to a different device.
Multiple Devices	My Phone supported up to 6 devices.
Automatic Sync	Users could set My Phone to sync daily, weekly or manually.
Online Access	The My Phone portal allowed users to view, add, edit, delete, sort, search, find duplicates and archive synchronized data.
Storage Limits	My Phone offered 200MB of free online storage.
Photo Sharing	My Phone supported photo sharing and captioning.
Map Last Known Location^{beta}	My Phone could provide a map of the last known location of a phone.
Intelligent Sync	My Phone only synchronised changes to data to minimize bandwidth, connecting via WiFi, PC (tethered) or cellular connections.

== My Phone premium feature package ==
My Phone offered premium features to help locate a lost phone:

Feature	Description
Remote Ring	Rings the phone loudly for 60 seconds.
Remote Lock	Allows users to lock a device and set a personal pin from the My Phone portal.
Map Current Location^{beta}	Presents the phone's current location on a map.
Remotely Erase	Erases the phone and resets it to factory default settings.

The premium features were available to users of the free service on an as-needed basis, and sold as a package for $4.99 in the US.

== See also ==
- Phone Link – Software application developed by Microsoft
