= Phone Companion =

Discontinued Windows 10 app

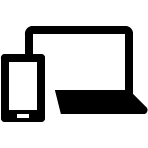

- Phone Companion in Windows 10
- Developer: Microsoft
- Operating system: Windows 10; Windows 10 Mobile
- Successor: Phone Link

Phone Companion is a discontinued app advertising and file transfer utility included with Windows 10 and available for Windows 10 Mobile. It provided a partial list of Microsoft apps that are available on Android, and Windows 10 Mobile. In order to use the Phone Companion, users had to sign in with a Microsoft Account, which would sync installation progress across devices. It was replaced by the Phone Link app in the October 2018 Update, but can still be accessed on prior versions.

== App advertising ==
The first screen allows users to choose a type of mobile device that they own. Once the user has chosen, a second screen presents the user with information on some of the available apps. Under the listing for Windows phones, there is a link to view available devices.

On the Windows 10 Mobile screen, users are shown a list of apps that are already built-into their phone's system: Cortana, Photos, Groove, Movies & TV, OneNote, Skype, "Office" (Word, Excel, and PowerPoint only in this listing), and Outlook. Clicking on an icon in the list provides a description of what the app does. It is not clear why OneNote, Outlook, Sway, Delve, and Office Lens are not included in the Office category.

If the user selects the Android or the iOS screen, they will see a list of apps available for that mobile operating system, all of which support Microsoft account sign-ins: Cortana, OneDrive, Groove, OneNote, Skype, "Office", and Outlook. There is a Get Started button below each. Clicking on one will lead the user to a series of steps with a description of the app or bundle, spot for emailing a link to the app on the mobile device's store, and button for marking that the app has been downloaded onto a mobile device.

Microsoft does not list its cross-platform apps for Xbox, Solitaire Collection, Money, Sports, News, Weather, Sway, Delve, Office Lens, GroupMe, or Bing on the Phone Companion.

== File transfer ==
Phone Companion can detect when a phone or tablet is plugged into the PC and displays the name of the device and manufacturer. When a phone is plugged in, Phone Companion links to the transfer activity in Photos or the phone's storage location in File Explorer.

Because File Explorer and Photos can handle file transfers on their own, Phone Companion is not required for file transfers. What it offers users is a visible shortcut to the transfer activities, of which users may have been unaware previously.

Due to the security policies of iOS, it is not possible to transfer files from a PC to an iPhone or an iPad using File Explorer.
