= BlackBerry Passport =

2014 smartphone model

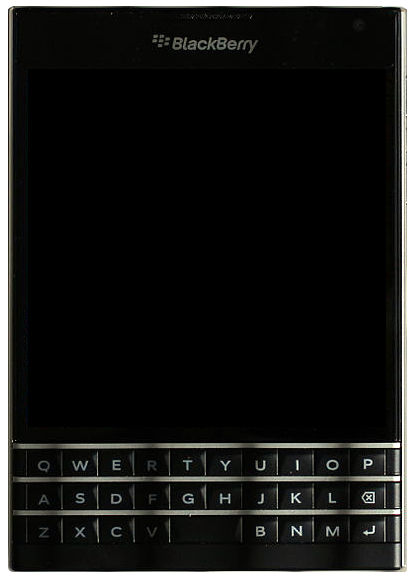
- Manufacturer: BlackBerry Limited
- First released: September 24, 2014; 11 years ago
- Successor: BlackBerry Priv
- Related: BlackBerry Classic
- Compatible networks: GSM, UMTS (including HSPA+), LTE
- Form factor: Candy bar smartphone
- Dimensions: 128 mm (5.0 in) H 90.3 mm (3.56 in) W 9.3 mm (0.37 in) D
- Weight: 194 g (6.84 oz)
- Operating system: BlackBerry 10.3
- System-on-chip: Qualcomm Snapdragon 801
- CPU: Krait 400, 2.2 GHz quad-core
- GPU: Adreno 330
- Memory: 3 GB RAM
- Storage: 32 GB internal storage
- Removable storage: Up to 128 GB microSDXC
- Battery: 3450 mAH non removable battery
- Rear camera: 13 megapixels, 1080p video capture, autofocus, optical image stabilization
- Front camera: 2 megapixels, 720p video capture
- Display: 4.5 in (110 mm) IPS LCD; 1440×1440 pixels, 453 PPI
- Connectivity: List: Wi-Fi: 802.11 b/g/n 2.4 GHz; Wi-Fi hotspot; DLNA; GPS NFC; Bluetooth 4.0; Micro-USB 2.0
- Data inputs: Multi-touch touchscreen, physical keyboard with touchpad
- Other: Accelerometer, Ambient light sensor, Gyroscope, Magnetometer, Proximity sensor

The BlackBerry Passport is a phablet developed by BlackBerry Limited. Officially released on September 24, 2014, the Passport is inspired by its namesake and incorporates features designed to make the device attractive to enterprise users, such as a unique square-shaped display measuring 4.5 inches diagonally, a compact physical keyboard with touchpad gestures, and the latest release of the company's BlackBerry 10 operating system.

Reception to the Passport was mixed; critics praised the quality of the device's design, screen, and keyboard for meeting the company's goals of creating a business-oriented device, along with an improved application selection through the integration of Amazon's Appstore for Android (taking advantage of the Android software support provided by BlackBerry 10) alongside BlackBerry's own store for native software. Criticism of the Passport was focused primarily on its irregular form factor in comparison to other phablets, making the device difficult to carry and use one-handed due to its increased width, while its keyboard was also panned for having an irregular layout in comparison to past BlackBerry devices.

== Development ==
In January 2014, BlackBerry Limited's new CEO John Chen indicated that, following the unsuccessful launch of BlackBerry 10 and its accompanying, consumer-oriented touchscreen devices (such as the BlackBerry Z10), along with the company's major loss of market share to competing smartphones such as Android devices and the iPhone line, the company planned to shift its focus back towards the enterprise market as part of its restructuring plan, and primarily manufacture phones that feature physical keyboards. In June 2014, Chen publicly teased two of the company's upcoming models, the BlackBerry Passport—a phablet with a square display, along with a successor to the Q10 known as the BlackBerry Classic, incorporating the array of navigation keys featured on past BlackBerry OS devices.

The company's return to a business-oriented focus influenced the design and functionality of the Passport; the overall design of the device was designed to evoke a similar form to its namesake, "a familiar and universal symbol of mobility". BlackBerry also touted that the use of a square-shaped, 4.5-inch display, rather than the rectangular 16:9 displays of other smartphones, in combination with its physical keyboard, would provide more room on-screen for business-oriented tasks such as document editing, image viewing (such as architectural schematics and x-rays), and web browsing. The company also noted that the increased width of the display would allow the Passport to show 60 characters per line of text, nearing a recommended measure for books at 66 per line.

Development of the Passport began in 2013; while even Chen himself was hesitant about the device due to its unusual form factor, he decided to allow continued development of the Passport, believing that it carried unique design qualities in comparison to other, competing smartphones. BlackBerry officially released the Passport on September 24, 2014 during a press event featuring retired NHL player Wayne Gretzky; describing the device as being aimed towards "power professionals" who are "achievement oriented" and "highly productive", Chen remarked that the goals of the Passport were to "drive productivity" and "break through the sea of rectangular-screen, all-touch devices." Chen also joked about Apple's recent "bendgate" incident during the presentation, remarking that unlike the iPhone 6, "bending [the Passport] needs a little effort."

BlackBerry announced plans to release the Passport in over 30 countries by the end of 2014; following the event, unlocked models of the Passport were made available for purchase on BlackBerry's website in Canada, France, Germany, the United Kingdom and the United States. Telus in Canada and AT&T in the United States were announced as the first two North American carriers to offer the Passport.

== Specifications ==
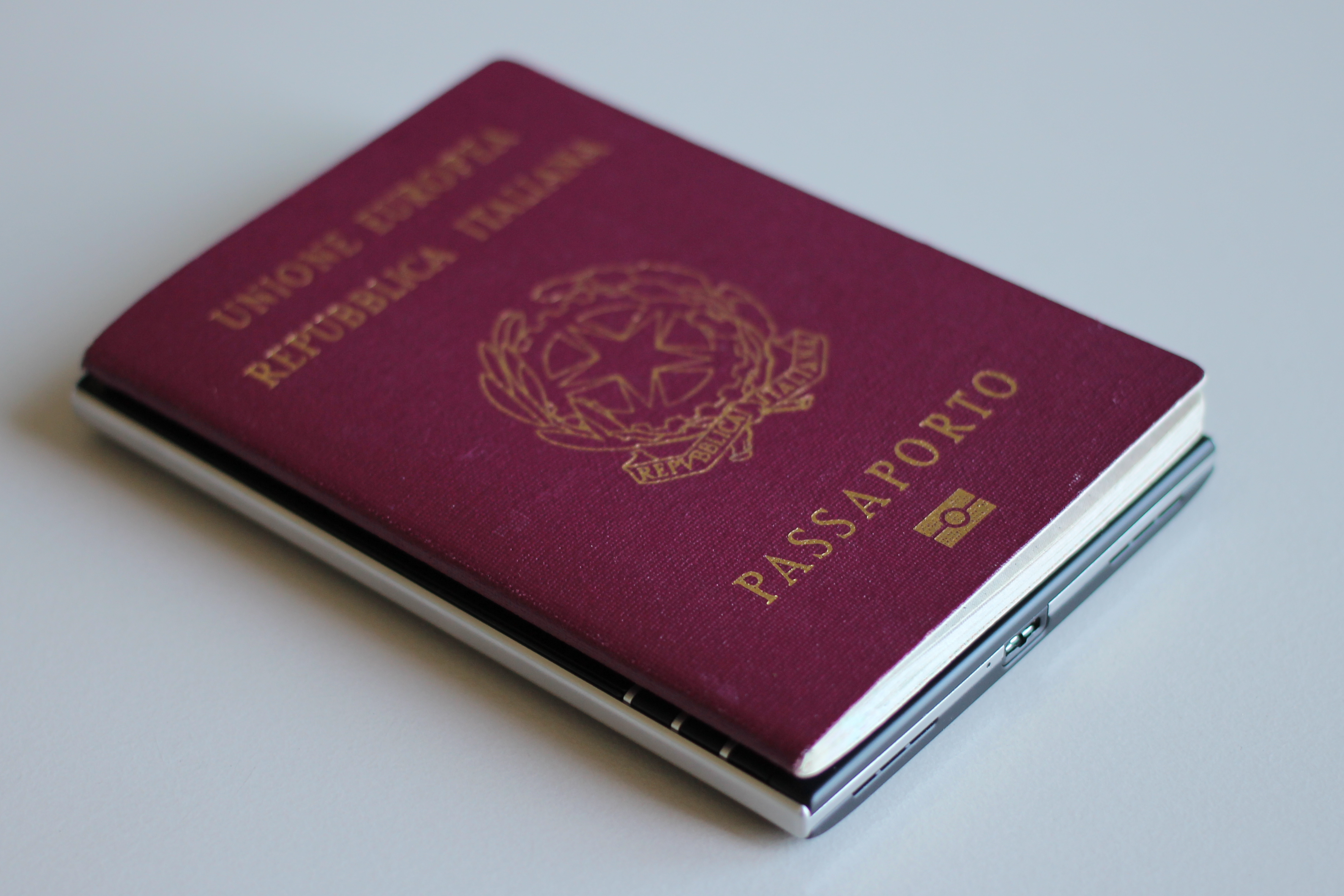
The Blackberry Passport underneath a passport

The BlackBerry Passport has dimensions similar to that of an international passport, and incorporates a steel frame with matte plastic as part of its design. The device utilizes a compact variation of BlackBerry's traditional physical keyboard design, using a modified layout with three rows and a small spacebar located in the middle of the bottom row alongside the remaining letters. Functions previously found on the fourth row (such as symbols and the Shift key) are accessible through a context-sensitive on-screen toolbar. The keyboard is also touch-sensitive; acting as a touchpad, it can register sliding gestures across its keys for scrolling, text selection, word deletion, and autocomplete suggestions.

The Passport features a square-shaped 4.5-inch IPS LCD with a resolution of 1440×1440, made by JDI (Japan Display Inc.), codenamed panorama, as opposed to a 16:9 display, making the Passport considerably wider than other phablets in its class. The Passport includes a quad-core, 2.2 GHz Qualcomm Snapdragon 801 system-on-chip with 3 GB of RAM, 32 GB of expandable, internal storage, along with a non-removable 3450 mAh battery rated for at least 30 hours of mixed usage. The Passport also includes a 13-megapixel rear-facing camera with optical image stabilization, and a 2-megapixel front-facing camera. The phone was shipped with 5 different modules, one of them made by LG Innotek (LG-IT) the others are made by Samsung Electro-Mechanics (Samco). During phone calls, the Passport can measure ambient noise using a microphone in its earpiece, which can then be used to automatically adjust call volume.

There are several revisions of the device. At least 13 are known, and they have many differences. Most notable are the different display backlight circuits, audio amplifiers. The sensors are the same on each reversion, all made by STMicroelectronics, but the wiring has significant differences. The dedicated sensors are LSM303D e-Compass, VL6180 proximity sensor and L3GD20 3-axis gyroscope. The rest of them are provided by an ST sensor hub codenamed avengers.

The Passport is preloaded with BlackBerry 10.3, the latest version of BlackBerry's operating system. The new version features a refreshed interface, a personal digital assistant known as BlackBerry Assistant, and other new features. Alongside BlackBerry World for native applications, 10.3 also includes the third-party Amazon Appstore, offering Android apps that can run on the Passport.

=== Silver Edition ===
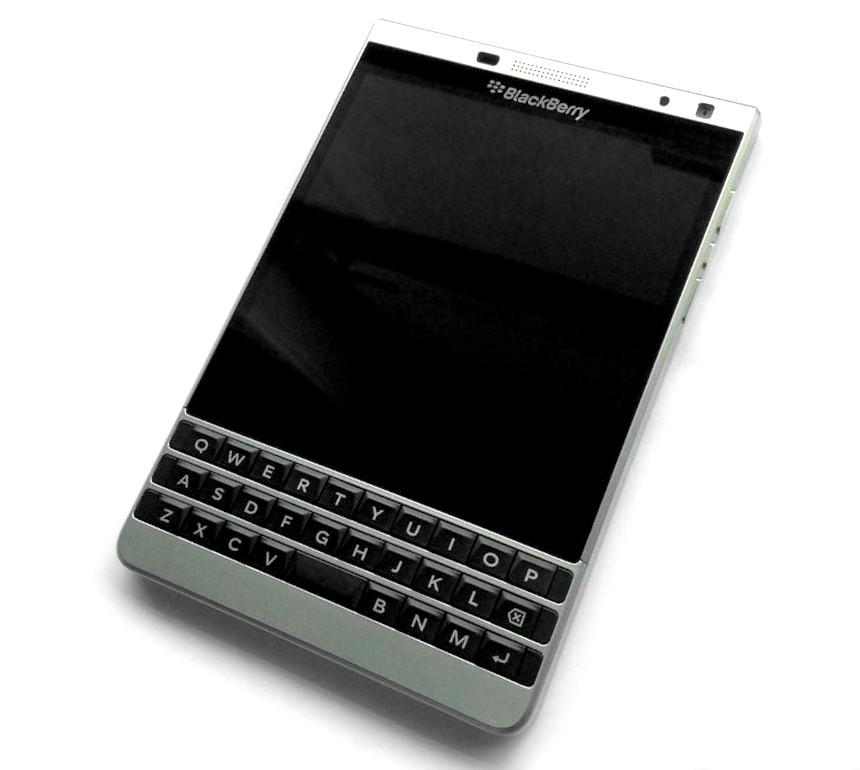
The Blackberry Passport SE features a silver casing

In early 2015, rumors and images of a new Passport design circulated online with code names such as Oslo and Dallas. Early reports falsely speculated that the device was designed for AT&T to launch in the China market. In July, it was confirmed that the device would be shipped as the Blackberry Passport Silver Edition, with an official announcement following in August 2015. Although Blackberry had previously released revisions of the Passport, the Silver Edition was given particular attention and launched as though it was a new device.

The primary changes to the Silver Edition were in its construction and appearance. The device is slightly larger and heavier than the original Passport, and has a metal case with rounded bottom corners, and a patterned, rubberized back for improved grip. The device also features a smoother keyboard with a larger chin below it. Di Tao, BlackBerry's Senior Industrial Designer, stated the Silver Edition was intended to give the Passport a more premium feel, improve antenna performance, and improve on the overall feel and performance of the device.

The Blackberry Passport Silver Edition first went on sale in North America on 4 August 2015, and later expanded into other territories including parts of Europe.

== Reception ==
The BlackBerry Passport received mixed reviews. Nate Ralph of CNET was positive in regards of the Passport, praising the quality of the Passport's display for meeting BlackBerry's stated goals of providing a display optimized primarily for reading and editing documents, and its keyboard for having a good quality, a "spacious typing experience", and unique touch gestures. The operating system was also praised for its performance, and for providing a better selection of apps through the Amazon Store, although the Assistant was panned for being slower than its competitors, and it was also noted that some apps (particularly Android games) might not be optimized well for the Passport's square screen. However, he believed that BlackBerry had gone "a step too far" in its attempt to design a device specifically for the enterprise market, noting that the size of the device made it difficult to use one-handed in comparison to competing phablets, concluding that the company's "myopic focus on text and productivity comes at the cost of creating a device as pleasant to hold as it would be to use, and that decision keeps the Passport from eclipsing its well-rounded peers."

Dan Seifert of The Verge praised its design for being robust and not needing a "clunky Otterbox" to withstand multiple drops, along with its display for having a high resolution and good viewing angles, its call quality, a sufficient camera (although it was panned for being slow to launch and take photos), and full-day battery life. The majority of criticism was derived from its form factor; the dimensions of the Passport (which made the device wider than both the Samsung Galaxy Note 4 and the iPhone 6 Plus) were criticized for making the device "uncomfortable" and difficult to carry in a pocket or use one-handed. The dimensions were also considered a hinder on productivity, noting that some use cases (such as watching videos and using Twitter) did not adapt well to the square screen, the device's keyboard was not as good as past BlackBerry phones due to its irregular layout, but still praised it for maintaining the company's traditional quality. The BlackBerry 10.3 operating system was praised for its refreshed appearance, and its attempt to address the platform's small number of third-party apps by bundling Amazon Appstore (despite still lacking key apps), but was criticized for its learning curve, performance issues (despite the device's relatively powerful hardware), and for similarly having mechanics that were "clumsy" and hindered productivity. In conclusion, Seifert stated in response to BlackBerry believing "power pros" would still carry another smartphone alongside their Passport, "if I can get my job done with just [an iPhone], why bother carrying two?"

Joanna Stern of the Wall Street Journal was similarly negative, remarking that while BlackBerry still had the best e-mail client of any smartphone platform, the Passport's keyboard was inferior to that of past BlackBerry devices, and shared criticism surrounding the device's design. She felt that the Passport demonstrated that BlackBerry was still "living in the past" in regards to its view of the smartphone industry and users' apparent need for a phone specifically for work usage—especially one that is such irregularly designed. In a preliminary review, Engadget noted that even with Amazon Appstore available, there was not enough software for the device, and concluded that "[the Passport] is built well and the keyboard is comfortable, but be prepared for a few odd stares from those around you." It was also noted that the size and shape of the Passport were similar to a previous Android phablet—the LG Optimus Vu.

=== Sales ===
In the two days following its official launch, 200,000 Passports were sold, and pre-order stock on both Amazon and BlackBerry's websites was sold out within 10 hours. BlackBerry Passport was launched in India in October 2013 and was available in India from 10 October onwards.

== Modding ==
Prior to the emergence of commercial "restomod" kits, enthusiasts in the BlackBerry community experimented with hardware modifications to extend the life of the Passport. Because the phone’s secure bootloader cannot be unlocked through software, the only way to load a different operating system involves removing the soldered 32 GB eMMC flash, programming a replacement with modified boot partitions and soldering it back; the postmarketOS project notes that unlocking the bootloader requires replacing the eMMC and reflashing its boot0 and boot1 partitions. This technique was used by developer Balázs Triszka (known as Balika011) and other volunteers to port LineageOS 18.1 (Android 11) to the Passport; contributions from Guillaume T. and others helped adapt the build for stability and performance. Because of restrictions imposed by BlackBerry's security scheme, these sources note that flashing Android onto a retail Passport still requires an eMMC swap and the use of tools to generate new boot images; no known software-only exploit exists. Early prototypes with unlocked bootloaders and experimental Android builds have been revived by swapping their eMMC chips, although the outdated hardware is limited to Android 11.

In June 2025, the Chinese company Zinwa Technologies announced plans to release an upgrade kit for the original BlackBerry Passport, codenamed P26. It will upgrade the mainboard and feature a MediaTek Helio G99, 12 GB RAM, 256 GB of internal flash storage, and Android 14 support. The P26 will be sold as a DIY kit and requires an original Passport for retrofitting.
