= ActiveSync =

Microsoft data synchronization app

- ActiveSync 4.5 on Windows XP
- Developer: Microsoft
- Release: September 10, 1996; 30 years ago
- Stable release: 4.5.5096 / February 13, 2007; 19 years ago
- Operating system: Windows 9x, Windows NT 4.0, Windows 2000, Windows XP
- Successor: Windows Mobile Device Center and Zune Software
- Website: www.microsoft.com/windowsmobile/activesync/default.mspx

ActiveSync is a mobile data synchronization app developed by Microsoft, originally released in 1996. It synchronizes data with handheld devices and desktop computers.

== Overview ==
ActiveSync allows a mobile device to be synchronized with either a desktop PC or a server running a compatible software product.

On desktops, ActiveSync synchronizes emails, calendar, contacts and tasks with Microsoft Outlook, along with Internet bookmarks and files. ActiveSync does not support all features of Outlook. For instance, contacts grouped into subfolders are not transferred. Only the contacts which are not in a subfolder are synchronized. In case of Exchange Server, only emails, calendar, contacts and tasks may be synchronized.

In the Windows Task Manager, the associated process is called wcescomm.exe.

ActiveSync also provides for the manual transfer of files to a mobile device, along with limited backup functionality, and the ability to install and uninstall mobile device applications.

Supported mobile devices include PDAs or smartphones running Windows Mobile, Windows CE, BlackBerry 10 or iOS but not the older BlackBerry versions, Palm OS and Symbian platforms. Windows Phone 7 doesn't support desktop ActiveSync synchronization.

Starting with Windows Vista, ActiveSync has been replaced with the Windows Mobile Device Center, which is included as part of the operating system.

== Release history ==
Version	Operating systems	Release date	Major changes
1.0	Windows 95	1996-09-10	Initial version (under name H/PC Explorer)
1.1.7077	Windows 95; Windows NT 4.0	1997-03-19	NT4 support; Stability and compatibility fixes; Revised EULA
2.0	Windows 95; Windows NT 4.0	Fall 1997	Renamed to Windows CE Services; Support for Windows CE 2; Windows CE 1 support dropped
2.1	Windows 95; Windows NT 4.0	1998-02	Support for Windows CE 2.1x
2.2	Windows 95; Windows NT 4.0; Windows 98	1998-09	NT4 installation easier; 33% faster than 2.1
3.0.0.9204	Windows 95; Windows NT 4.0; Windows 98	1999-08-16	Renamed to ActiveSync; Faster, simplified, and vastly improved.; Removed the association between RAS/DUN and the Windows CE connection stack
3.1.9386	Windows 95; Windows NT 4.0; Windows 98	1999-11-24	USB synchronization and the inclusion of the AvantGo host client; Auto-adjusting baud rate
3.1.9439	Windows 95; Windows NT 4.0; Windows 98; Windows 2000	?	Sync fixes
3.1.9587	Windows 95; Windows NT 4.0; Windows 98; Windows 2000	2001-07-31	Added synchronisation support for Microsoft Exchange Server 2000; Fixes for Outlook 98 / 2000 Security updates; Fixed a problem with the USB sync option
3.5.1176	Windows 95; Windows NT 4.0; Windows 98; Windows 2000; Windows XP	2001-08-06	Integrated support for new Windows XP and Office XP releases and Pocket PC 2002; Improved USB functionality, security and sync performance; New connection sounds
3.5.12007	Windows 95; Windows NT 4.0; Windows 98; Windows 2000; Windows XP	2002-03-01	Revised high color program icon
3.6.2148	Windows 95; Windows NT 4.0; Windows 98; Windows 2000; Windows XP; Windows Server 2003; Windows Home Server	2002-11	Support for the new range of Smartphone devices; Customary security updates and synchronisation performance improvements; New Get Connected Wizard; Improves on remote synchronisation by preventing error messages and dialogues from halting sync process
3.7.3083	Windows 95; Windows NT 4.0; Windows 98; Windows 2000; Windows XP; Windows Server 2003; Windows Home Server	2003-05-06	Minor updates to internal icon set; Corrects a discovered security flaw in ActiveSync; Improvements to the synchronisation wizard, other UI changes and general enhancements; Improvements to support forthcoming Microsoft Office 2003 release and Windows Mobile 2003
3.7.1.3244	Windows 95; Windows NT 4.0; Windows 98; Windows 2000; Windows XP; Windows Server 2003; Windows Home Server	2003-10-10	Improvements to USB drivers and issues related to synchronisation; Get Connected Wizard's interface modified slightly.
3.7.1.4034	Windows 95; Windows NT 4.0; Windows 98; Windows 2000; Windows XP; Windows Server 2003; Windows Home Server	2004-03-26	Fixed reported bugs with Windows Explorer and XP Firewall integration.
3.8.0.5004	Windows 95; Windows NT 4.0; Windows 98; Windows 2000; Windows XP; Windows Server 2003; Windows Home Server	2005-01-06	Secure functionality and provide updates for Windows XP SP2 systems; Performance improvements in synchronisation; Circumvents XP Firewall prompts that users experienced with other program versions upon first run.; Disables the Ethernet (LAN, Bluetooth) and RAS (Modem and WAN) connection method by default
4.0.4343	Windows 2000; Windows XP; Windows Server 2003; Windows Home Server	2005	Users able to specify installation directory; Removal of on-personal area connectivity options from the synchronisation mix.; Services for connections with Microsoft SQL server are included, along with a synchronisation update for Windows Media Player 10; GUI refresh
4.0.4358	Windows 2000; Windows XP; Windows Server 2003; Windows Home Server	2005	Retail version included only on Windows Mobile 5 device CDs
4.1.0.4841	Windows 2000; Windows XP; Windows Server 2003; Windows Home Server	2005-11-18	Critical update
4.2.0.4876	Windows 2000; Windows XP; Windows Server 2003; Windows Home Server	2006-06-06	Microsoft Outlook improvements: Resolves issues relating to error code 85010014; Proxy/DTPT interaction improvements: Improved auto configuration of device Connection Manager settings when desktop has no proxy path to the Internet; Improved Desktop Pass Thru behavior with ISA proxy failures; Partnership improvements: Better resolution of multiple devices with the same name syncing with the same desktop; Connectivity improvements: Better handling of VPN clients (resolve unbinding of protocols from our RNDIS adapter). New auto detection of connectivity failure with user diagnostic alerts; New troubleshooting utility
4.5.5096	Windows 2000; Windows XP; Windows Server 2003; Windows Home Server	2007-02-13	Faster file transfer speed and photo sync via Outlook are only available for Windows Mobile 5.0 powered devices.; Users of Microsoft Exchange 2003 Service Pack 2 with devices running the Messaging and Security Feature Pack for Windows Mobile 5.0 will benefit from the following feature enhancements included in ActiveSync 4.5: Direct Push Technology, local device wipe, and certificate powered authentication to Microsoft Exchange.; Microsoft Office Outlook 2000 not supported; Conversion of database files for use on a mobile device is not supported; Conversion of font files for use on a mobile device is not supported by ActiveSync 4.5

== See also ==
Software

- Handheld PC Explorer
- SyncToy
- Windows Mobile Device Center

Devices

- Handheld PC
- Palm-size PC
- Pocket PC
- Smartphone

Concepts

- Push email

Protocols

- Exchange ActiveSync
