= Samsung SGH-A561 =

Mobile phone model

- Manufacturer: Samsung Electronics
- Availability by region: August 2008

The Samsung SGH-A561, also known as Samsung A746, is a flip open or folding mobile phone released by Samsung corporation in August 2008. It has both 2G (GSM 850 / 900 / 1800 / 1900) and 3G network (HSDPA 850 / 1900) as well as EDGE for faster internet access.

== Camera ==
It was one of the first swiveling camera phones, in which the 2.0-megapixel camera can rotate back and front, providing the user with more control over taking pictures and video calling.

== Memory ==
The phone has an internal memory of 50 MB and can hold up to 4 GB on a microSD. This allows for 1,000 entries in the phone book, and 20 dialed, received and missed calls in the call records.

== Features ==
- Messaging - SMS, EMS, MMS, em-ail, instant messaging
- Browser - WAP 2.0/xHTML, HTML
- Games

Java - MIDP 2.0
Video - MP4/3gp player

- App

Voice memo
Organizer
World clock
Stopwatch
Countdown timer
