= Red Bend Software =

Israeli mobile software management company

- Type: Private
- Industry: Software; Communication Systems; Information Technology
- Founded: April 1999 (Rosh Ha'ayin, Israel)
- Headquarters: Waltham, MA, United States
- Key people: Yoram Salinger (President & CEO)
- Products: FOTA (technology)
- Website: www.redbend.com

Red Bend Software was a software company providing mobile software management technology to mobile phone manufacturers and operators. Its software was deployed by handset manufacturers including Kyocera, LG Electronics, Motorola, Sharp, Sony Mobile and ZTE, as well as customers in the M2M, automotive and enterprise markets. Harman International Industries acquired the company in January 2015. The company's initial funding was provided by Carmel Ventures.

== History ==
The company was first established in 1999, in Rosh Ha'ayin, Israel, and by the following year had finalised the beta of its future technology, vCurrent, and signed its first agreement with BackWeb Technologies. Red Bend completed its first round of venture funding in 2000. In 2003, the corporate headquarters were located in Boston, Massachusetts, with research and development continuing in Israel.

In 2010, Red Bend Software acquired VirtualLogix, developers of mobile virtualisation software. Red Bend was itself acquired by Harman International Industries in 2015. Red Bend has held membership of the Open Mobile Alliance since 2010.

== Locations ==
Red Bend is headquartered in Waltham, MA in the United States. The company has offices in Israel, the United Kingdom, France, China, Japan, and South Korea.

== Products ==
Red Bend's vRapid Mobile(R) supports FOTA updating as well as software component management, also known as SCOTA (Software Components OTA).

Red Bend's vDirect Mobile(TM) is an OMA DM-based device management client.
