= WBXML =

WAP Binary XML
- Internet media type: application/vnd.wap.wbxml
- Developed by: WAP Forum, Open Mobile Alliance
- Website: www.openmobilealliance.org/release/Browsing/V2_4-20110329-A/WAP-192-WBXML-20010725-a.pdf

WAP Binary XML (WBXML) is a binary representation of XML. It was developed by the WAP Forum and since 2002 is maintained by the Open Mobile Alliance as a standard to allow XML documents to be transmitted in a compact manner over mobile networks and proposed as an addition to the World Wide Web Consortium's Wireless Application Protocol family of standards. The MIME media type application/vnd.wap.wbxml has been defined for documents that use WBXML.

WBXML is used by a number of mobile phones. Usage includes Exchange ActiveSync for synchronizing device settings, address book, calendar, notes and emails, SyncML for transmitting address book and calendar data, Wireless Markup Language, Wireless Village, OMA DRM for its rights language and Over-the-air programming for sending network settings to a phone.

== See also ==
- Extensible Binary Meta Language
- Compiled Wireless Markup Language
- XML
- Binary XML
- BSON (Binary JSON)
- Efficient XML Interchange
