= Samsung Intensity II =

2G mobile phone

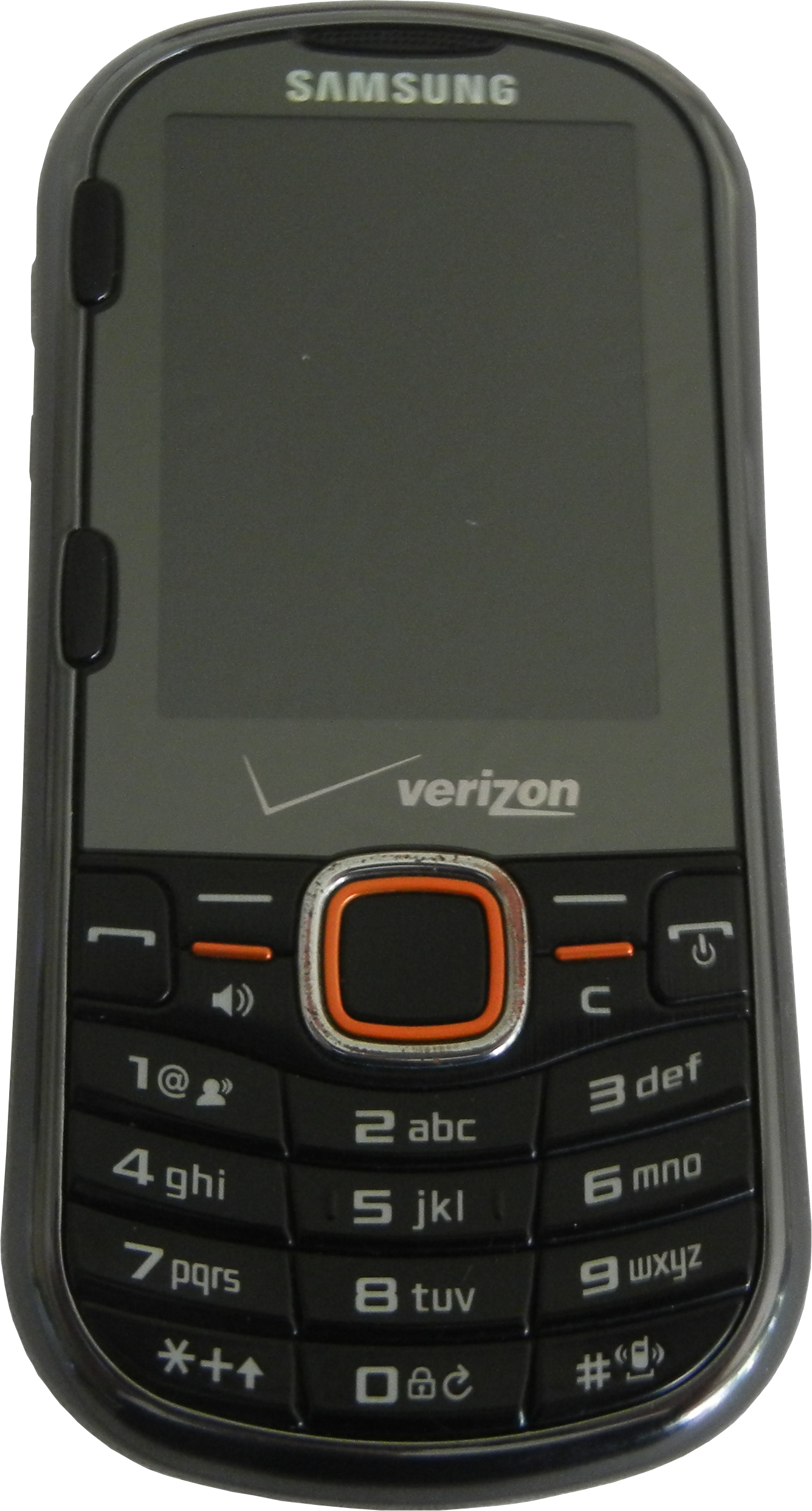
- Manufacturer: Samsung
- Type: Feature phone
- Series: Intensity
- First released: July 29, 2010 (16 years ago)
- Predecessor: Samsung Intensity
- Compatible networks: 2G
- Form factor: Slider
- Colors: "Deep gray"; "Metallic blue"
- Dimensions: 4.51 in (115 mm) H; 2.87 in (73 mm) W; 0.10 in (2.5 mm) D
- Weight: 4.1 oz (120 g)
- Storage: 100.95 MB
- Removable storage: microSD 32 GB
- Rear camera: 1.3 megapixels
- Display: 2.2 in (56 mm) QVGA; 240 × 320 pixels
- Connectivity: Bluetooth; GPS; USB 2.0
- Data inputs: QWERTY keyboard; Voice recognition
- Model: SCH-U460

The Samsung Intensity II is a 2G mobile phone released for the Verizon Wireless network on July 29, 2010. Successor to the Samsung Intensity, the slider feature phone was marketed to teens.

== Specifications ==
Model number SCH-U460, the Intensity II is a mobile phone by Samsung, in the company's Intensity series, for the Verizon Wireless network. A successor to 2009's Samsung Intensity, the Intensity II looks very similar: it measures 4.51 by 2.87 by 0.10 inches (114.6 mm × 72.9 mm × 2.5 mm), weighs 4.1 ounces (120 g), and has a slider form factor.

The 2G radio has a specific absorption rate of 1.04 watts per kilogram (0.47 W/lb) at the head, and .87 watts per kilogram (0.39 W/lb) for the body. Additionally, the phone has a Bluetooth radio, Global Positioning System receiver, and USB 2.0 Full Speed port. Further input methods include a full QWERTY keyboard and voice recognition.

With 100.95 megabytes of available on-device storage, the Intensity II can also accommodate microSD cards up to 32 gigabytes in size. The 1.3 megapixel camera features digital zoom up to 10× and an LED flash. The phone's QVGA display measures 240 by 320 pixels, measuring 2.2 inches (56 mm) diagonally. The battery is rated for "up to 300 hours" on standby, and "up to 300 minutes" of talk time. Samsung marketed the phone to teens as "eco-friendly", being manufactured with recycled plastics and without beryllium and polyvinyl chloride. It was made in two colors: "metallic blue" and "deep gray".

The built-in media player is capable of playing files formatted as Advanced Audio Coding, Advanced Systems Format, High-Efficiency Advanced Audio Coding, MIDI, MP3, and Windows Media Audio. The web browser uses WAP 2.0. Included software for text communication includes AOL Instant Messenger, Facebook, MSN Messenger, Multimedia Messaging Service, MySpace, SMS, Twitter, and Yahoo! Messenger.

== Reception ==
CNET rated the phone at 7/10, saying that its striking similarity to the original Intensity was both a boon and a loss: the QWERTY keyboard is excellent for using the very-capable telecommunication tools, though the navigation keys and 2.5mm phone connector were too small for ease of use.
