= Samsung SGH-E715 =

Mobile phone model

- Manufacturer: Samsung Electronics
- First released: September 17, 2003
- Compatible networks: GSM 900/1900 (North America) (E710: GSM 900/1800 (Europe)), EDGE
- Form factor: Clamshell
- Dimensions: 3.5" x 1.8" x 0.9" (8.9 X 4.6 X 2.3 cm)
- Weight: 2.9 oz (82 g)
- Memory: 6.45 MB
- Display: 128x160 pixels, 65,536 Color TFT LCD
- External display: 80 x 64 + 2 line fixed OLED, 16 Gray
- Connectivity: GPRS GPRS Class 8, CSD

The Samsung SGH-E715 is a clamshell-style mobile phone created by Samsung Electronics.

== Features ==
The phone has features including:

- Multiple photo shooting sizes and qualities: VGA (640 X 480), QVGA (320 X 240), QQVGA (160 X 120), Mobile (128 X 128).
- Integrated LED flash
- Built in web browser
- Multiple messaging capability: SMS, EMS, MMS
- Configurable wallpapers and ringtones
- Java for additional games and applications
- Alarm clock
- Calendar
- Calculator

== Availability ==
The SGH-E715 was sold via T-Mobile USA and used the same hardware to operate on European frequencies, with support for the 2G network.

== Reception ==
The SGH-E715 was met with lukewarm reception, with reviewers comparing its features to those on the E710 and V205.
