= InnoPath Software =

Software company

innoPath Software
- Type: Private
- Industry: Device management software
- Founded: 2003; 23 years ago
- Headquarters: Sunnyvale, California, USA
- Owner: Independent (2003-16); Qualcomm (2016–24); Oliver Wyman (2024–present)
- Website: www.innopath.com

innoPath Software is a software company that provides mobile device management technology to wireless operators and mobile device manufacturers. The technology enables operators to remotely connect, configure, troubleshoot and secure end-user mobile devices.

Headquartered in Sunnyvale, California, it has international offices in various locations, such as Nacka (Sweden), Beijing (China), Richmond, London (UK), Tokyo (Japan) and Seoul (Korea).

In March 2024, it was announced that consulting firm Oliver Wyman had completed the purchase of Innopay.

== History ==
Founded in 1999 as DoOnGo Technologies, the firm was relaunched in 2003 as InnoPath with firmware over-the-air (FOTA) deployments in Japan, soon spreading to operators in North America. Then the focus became mobile device management.

It was a founding member of the Open Mobile Alliance and part of the OMA Device Management Working Group, and through these associations donated more than 70 submissions of proprietary source code. innoPath is also a member–participant of the following industry organizations: LiMo Foundation, CTIA - The Wireless Association, GSMA/Mobile World Congress, the Wireless Informatics Forum, WiMAX Forum, and the Symbian Foundation.
