= Kyocera KX16 =

Kyocera Candid
- Manufacturer: Motorola
- Type: mobile/cellular screen = 128x128 pixels, 65,000 colors
- Compatible networks: AMPS 850, CDMA 850 and 1900
- Dimensions: 3.54 in × 1.89 in × 0.98 in (90 mm × 48 mm × 25 mm)
- Weight: 3.90 oz (111 g)
- Connectivity: 1xRTT, WAP 2.0

The Kyocera KX16, sometimes referred to as the Kyocera Candid, is the first clamshell-style camera phone from Kyocera. Features include:

- VGA (640x480) camera with LED flash and self-timer
- LCD color display with 128x128 pixels supporting 65,000 colors
- BREW downloadable games
- EMS and picture messaging
- Monochrome external display
- 500-name internal address book

Other technical data include:

- Form Factor: Clamshell
- Stub Antenna
- Battery Life: Talk: 3.50 hours, Standby: 170 hours (7.1 days)

The Kyocera KX16 is a relatively basic CDMA phone with a digital camera, speakerphone and voice-dialing. It's an above-average phone for entry-level users.

== Carriers ==
The phone has been distributed in North America by the following carriers:

- Alltel (U.S.)
- US Cellular (U.S.)
- Cricket Communications (U.S.)
