= WDP =

WDP may refer to:

- Walt Disney Pictures, main film studio from The Walt Disney Studios
- WDP (company), a paintball manufacturer, distributor, and field operator in England
- William Dudley Pelley, an American writer, occultist, and fascist political activist
- Wireless Datagram Protocol, a datagram-oriented element of the Wireless Application Protocol suite
- World Day of Prayer, an international ecumenical Christian laywomen’s initiative
