= MM2 =

mm² is a short form for square millimeter, an international unit of area.

Mm² is a short form for square megameter, also an international unit of area.

MM2 may refer to:

- MM2, a class of force fields; see force field (chemistry)
- MM2 (MMS), an interface utilized by the Multimedia Messaging Service standard
- Mega Man 2, a 1988 video game for the NES
- Mega Man II (Game Boy), a 1991 video game for the Game Boy
- Midtown Madness 2, a 2000 video game for the PC
- Motocross Madness 2, a 2000 video game for the PC
- Might and Magic II: Gates to Another World, a 1988 video game
- Metal Max 2, a 1993 video game for the SNES
- MM2 register, a CPU register used by the MMX extension
- Modigliani–Miller theorem (proposition 2), a theorem on capital structure
- Mario Maker 2, a 2019 video game for the Nintendo Switch
- Murder Mystery 2, a 2023 Netflix film
- Maybach Music 2, a Rick Ross Song from his 2009 Album Deeper Than Rap
- mm2 Entertainment, an Asian media production and distribution company
- Melbourne Metro 2, a proposed rail project in Melbourne, Australia
- Murder Mystery 2, a game in Roblox
- mm2 (crystal class), rhombic pyramidal
