= Mobile harassment =

Bullying in mobile phone communications

Mobile harassment refers to the act of sending any type of text message, sex photo message, video message, or voicemail from a mobile phone that causes the receiver to feel harassed, threatened, tormented, humiliated, embarrassed or otherwise victimized. It is recognized as a form of cyberbullying.

== Prevalence ==
Mobile harassment has emerged as a worldwide trend due to the prevalence of mobile devices. . Recent studies indicate that harassment through mobile texting is particularly pervasive in countries like the United Kingdom and Australia, while the United States experiences a higher prevalence of harassment through the Internet.

In 2009, a survey in the United Kingdom revealed that approximately 14 percent of participants reported they had been victims of mobile harassment ranging from name calling, threatening text messages, or photos or videos intended to frighten or intimidate. Another study from Queensland, Australia, found that 93.7 percent of teenagers experienced mobile harassment of some kind. This study concluded that girls tend to experience and perpetrate more mobile bullying than boys. A 2021 study indicated that there is a 1.8 percent higher prevalence of girls claiming to be victims of cyberbullying.

Interestingly, students who identify as transgender experience cyberbullying at a rate 11.7% higher than their peers. While teenagers who identify as transgender are less likely to commit mobile harassment, non-heterosexual teenagers are more likely to be victims and be the offenders.

Cyberbullying offending peaks at around 13 years old, but the age of victims peaks at about 14 to 15 years old. Researchers have also revealed that approximately one-third of adolescents have been subjected to harassment or cyberbullying. However, the actual number of victims could be higher, as some may not recognize they have experienced mobile harassment, while others may choose not to acknowledge it due to feelings of humiliation.

Cases of mobile harassment often transpire outside of school. However, situations where the perpetrators and victims are classmates can cause the harassment to spill over to the students' school environment.

== Solutions ==
In the U.S., there isn't federal legislation that specifically addresses mobile harassment and cyber bullying. However, numerous schools have policies and regulations to prevent mobile harassment. For instance, administrators in some schools prohibit students from taking pictures and sharing visual materials within the school premises.

Certain schools have taken a step further by proposing complete bans on the use of mobile devices on school grounds. Waldorf Schools for instance, adhere to a strict anti-technology philosophy aimed at eradicating cyberbullying on campus. This approach has gained traction among families in Silicon Valley and is now used in more than 1,000 institutions across 91 countries, including 136 schools in the U.S.

Private organizations are also increasingly adopting regulatory policies to prevent mobile harassment. For instance, Facebook adopted internal harassment and bullying policies. The social media company, which is cited as one of the most commonly used networks to harass people, also adopted measures that enable them to "remove content that appears to purposefully target private individuals with the intention of degrading or shaming them.”

== Raising Awareness ==
In November 2009, LG Mobile Phones launched an advertising campaign in the United States that used humor aimed to encourage teens to think before they text. The campaign, produced by DiGennaro Communications, featured James Lipton and carried the tagline "Before you text, give it a ponder."

== In popular culture ==
The television show Gossip Girl features numerous episodes centered around misinterpreted or questionable text messages.
