= ID-MM7 =

ID-MM7 is a protocol developed and promoted by the Liberty Alliance, driven by major mobile operators such as Vodafone and Telefónica Móviles, to standardize identity-based web services interfaces to mobile messaging.

The ID-MM7 specification adds significant value to existing web services. MM7 has long been used by operators for relaying MMS and SMS traffic. ID-MM enables an entirely new business model wherein the content providers know their subscribers only pseudonymously - providing the capability to thwart spam, identity theft and fraud.

Known implementations of the protocol include:

- Symlabs Federated Identity Platform ID-Messaging
