= Compiled Wireless Markup Language =

In networking for mobile devices, WMLC is a format for the efficient transmission of WML web pages over Wireless Application Protocol (WAP). Its primary purpose is to compress (or rather tokenise) a WML page for transport over low-bandwidth internet connections such as GPRS/2G.

WMLC is apparently synonymous with Wireless Application Protocol Binary XML (WBXML).

== Description ==
WMLC is most efficient for pages that contain frequently repeated strings of characters. Commonly used phrases such as "www." and "http://www." are tokenised and replaced with a single byte just before transmission and then re-inserted at the destination.

WMLC has an added advantage that the data can be progressively decoded unlike some compression algorithms that require all of the data to be available before decompression begins. As soon as the first few bytes of WMLC data are available, the WAP browser can start creating the page, this means the user can see the page being constructed as it is downloaded.

Content type is application/vnd.wap.wmlc.
