= MM4 =

MM4 may refer to:

- Mega Man 4, a 1991 video game for the NES
- Mega Man IV (Game Boy), a 1994 video game for the Game Boy
- MM4 (force field), a class of force fields
- MM4 (MMS), a type of Multimedia Messaging Service interface
- MM4 register, a CPU register used by the MMX extension
- Might and Magic IV: Clouds of Xeen, a 1992 video role-playing game in the Might and Magic series
- Moment Musical 4, a part of a six-piece opus made to resemble different eras of music by Sergei Rachmaninoff
