= The SyncML Initiative =

The SyncML Initiative, Ltd. was a non-profit corporation formed by a group of companies who co-operated to produce an open standard for data synchronization and device management.

Prior to SyncML, data synchronization and device management had been based on a set of different, proprietary protocols, each functioning only with a limited number of devices, systems and data types.

The SyncML Initiative, Ltd. consolidated into the Open Mobile Alliance (OMA) in 2002, contributing their technical work to the OMA technical Working Groups: Device Management Working Group and Data Synchronization Working Group. The SyncML legacy specifications were converted to the OMA format with the 1.2.2 versions of OMA SyncML, OMA Data Synchronization and OMA Device Management specifications.
