= Wireless Village =

Wireless Village is a set of specifications for mobile instant messaging and presence services. It is intended to be a standard for cellphones and mobile devices to use these services across platforms.

Many wireless phones now include mobile instant messaging capabilities designed to hook into messaging services using IMPS on a carrier's network, formerly known as the Wireless Village protocol. Those phones implement it as an IM icon on the phone, which is typically renamed and customized by the cellphone carrier or removed completely if not supported at the network level. Most Nokia and Motorola phones have that feature, as do many Sony Ericsson phones.

Wireless Village has recently consolidated into the Open Mobile Alliance (OMA) and no longer exists as an independent organization.

== Description ==
The white paper describes the service:

"Where possible, the protocol makes use of existing Internet and Web technologies. These technologies are implemented widely and are well tested, so their use within the protocol ensure easy implementation and interoperability testing. XML, the Extensible Markup Language, is rapidly emerging as the lingua franca for representing structured data over the Web. To the extent possible, the protocol uses XML to represent the protocol data being exchanged during an IMPS session. IMPS activities in the IETF IMPP have received widespread interest throughout the industry. Although it is still in development, to the extent possible, the Wireless Village initiative will support the CPIM draft and build upon it. Other useful standards in this space include the Multipurpose Internet Mail Extensions (MIME) for registering the format of the IMPS protocol messages."

== History ==
An announcement was made when this service was conceived by Ericsson, Motorola and Nokia. The specification is maintained by the Open Mobile Alliance, and is currently at version 1.3 of the protocol.

As of now, only a few public services exist using Wireless Village. Any unlocked phone can be configured to use these services, and therefore connect to other instant messaging services if implemented.

== Operator implementations ==
- noknok, MTN South Africa, South Africa's 1st operator launched IMPS service. It does not work with native phone applications.

== Yamigo ==
Yamigo was a free communications service, based in Finland, that allowed instant messaging on mobile phones over wireless data services such as GPRS. The service was based on the protocol Wireless Village, developed by the Open Mobile Alliance, which is a joint venture between Nokia, Sony Ericsson, Motorola and other mobile device manufacturers.

Certain models of mobile phones that include a chat client could access the Yamigo network. These included certain models of phones from Nokia, Motorola, Sony Ericsson and Siemens. Once registered, Yamigo users could send messages to each other, and to users on Yahoo! Messenger, MSN Messenger, AOL Instant Messenger and ICQ. Yamigo supported importing contact lists from those services automatically.

Users connected to Yamigo via WAP and the internet. On the service's sign up page, users selected how frequently their phone polled the Yamigo network. Because it is a client-server protocol, receiving messages depended on how often the phone was set to poll the network. The service was abandoned in late 2005, and the last upgrade was version .19 in April 2005.

== See also ==
- Instant Messaging - Detailed Article on Instant Messaging and related services
- Presence - Detailed Article on Presence and related services
- Open Mobile Alliance - a standards developing organisation managing the (mobile) Instant Messaging and Presence Service IMPS specification
