= Hyundai MB 910 =

Watch phone by Hyundai

Hyundai MB-910
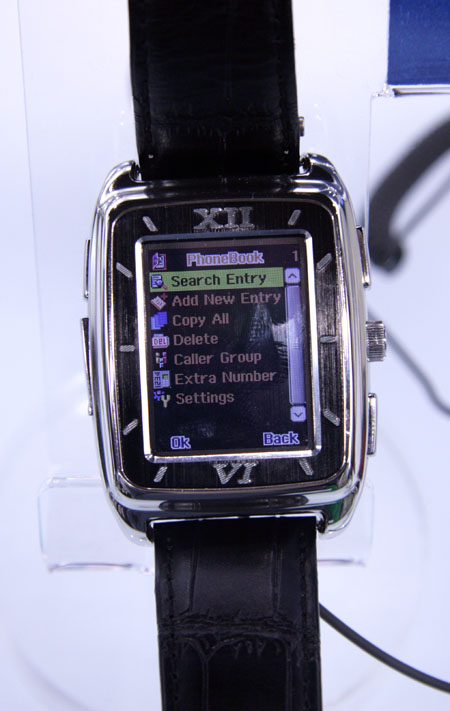
- Manufacturer: Hyundai Mobile Europe (Leitz Austria Vertriebs GmbH)
- Availability by region: Q1 2009
- Predecessor: W-100
- Compatible networks: GSM 900/1800/1900, GPRS Class 12
- Form factor: Watch
- Dimensions: 58.1×44.2×16.4 mm (2.29×1.74×0.65 in)
- Weight: 58 g (2 oz)
- Memory: 128MB of RAM
- Battery: 400mAh
- Display: 1.5"
- Connectivity: Bluetooth 2.0, mini USB
- Data inputs: Touchscreen

The MB-910 is a tri-band/GPRS watch phone made by Hyundai Mobile Europe in Leitz Austria Vertriebs GmbH.

Its main feature is a 1.5-inch, 132 x 176 pixel, 65k colour touchscreen, which is contained within a plastic watch casing. The screen alternates between a clock mode and phone mode. The MB-910’s features include a multimedia player for music and video, a WAP 2.0 web browser, an email client and other productivity tools. The internal memory is 128MB and there is no expansion slot. Contacts, text and picture messages are limited to 300.

As a phone, it is used in conjunction with a Bluetooth headset and can operate in a hands free manner. It offers a talk-time of up to three hours and up to 70 hours on standby

The MB-910 was released in mainland Europe during early 2009, priced at around € 160. Following the MB-910 showing at the Mobile World Congress 2009 show, a UK release is planned for Q2, priced SIM-free at around £200.
