= MM9 =

MM9 may refer to:

- Mega Man 9, a 2008 video game in the Mega Man series
- Might and Magic IX, a 2002 video role-playing game in the Might and Magic series
- MM9, standard used by the Multimedia Messaging Service in mobile networks, see MMS Architecture
