= Street TV =

Street TV was the first interactive made-for-mobile TV show in Australia. It began broadcasting in 2007 - a 30min weekly episode capturing stories on Music Arts and Culture in Australia. It was screened free of charge on Vodafone live! mobile TV with 3g.

In 2007 the show won an ADMA award for the best consumer content on mobile. The show was the brain child of Joshua Thomason who has since gone on to be an industry leader in the production of made for mobile content including MMS.
