= MM7 =

MM7 may refer to:

- MM7 (MMS), a type of Multimedia Messaging Service interface
- MM7 register, a CPU register used by the MMX extension
- Mega Man 7, a 1995 SNES game in the Mega Man video game series
- Might and Magic VII: For Blood and Honor, a 1999 PC role-playing video game
- m^{M7}, mM7, m/M7 or m(M7), chord symbols for a minor major seventh chord
- "MM7", a 2022 song by Jer Lau
