= ROAP =

ROAP can mean:

- Rights Object Acquisition Protocol
- RTCWeb Offer/Answer Protocol
- Rapidly oscillating Ap star (roAp star).
