= Wireless Datagram Protocol =

Wireless Datagram Protocol (WDP) defines the movement of information from receiver to the sender and resembles the User Datagram Protocol in the Internet protocol suite.

The Wireless Datagram Protocol (WDP), a protocol in WAP architecture, covers the Transport Layer Protocols in the Internet model. As a general transport service, WDP offers to the upper layers an invisible interface independent of the underlying network technology used. In consequence of the interface common to transport protocols, the upper layer protocols of the WAP architecture can operate independently of the underlying wireless network. By letting only the transport layer deal with physical network-dependent issues, global interoperability can be acquired using mediating gateways.

== See also ==
- Wireless Application Protocol
- Wireless Session Protocol
- Wireless transaction protocol
