= Rights Object Acquisition Protocol =

Rights Object Acquisition Protocol is a suite of XML-based digital rights management (DRM) security protocols which enables Open Mobile Alliance-conformant user devices to request and acquire viewing and/or editing rights, permissions, privileges and other attributes from a Rights Issuer. This protocol has been specified in the OMA DRM Specification v2.0.

The ROAP protocol suite enables communication between a Rights Issuing (RI) entity and a DRM Agent resident in the user device. Rights, permissions, privileges and other attributes are encapsulated into object oriented (OO) entities called Rights Objects (RO).

The basic functionalities enabled by ROAP include:

- Registration of user devices (4-pass Registration Protocol)
- Request and Acquisition of RO (2-pass Rights Object Acquisition Protocol, 1-pass ROAP)
- Joining and leaving of domain (2-pass Join Domain Protocol, 2-pass Leave Domain Protocol)

All protocols included in the ROAP protocol suite except the 1-pass ROAP are initialized when the user device receives a ROAP Trigger XML document. The MIME type of the ROAP Trigger document is "application/vnd.oma.drm.roap-trigger+xml".
