= Samsung Intensity (series) =

Line of mobile phone models

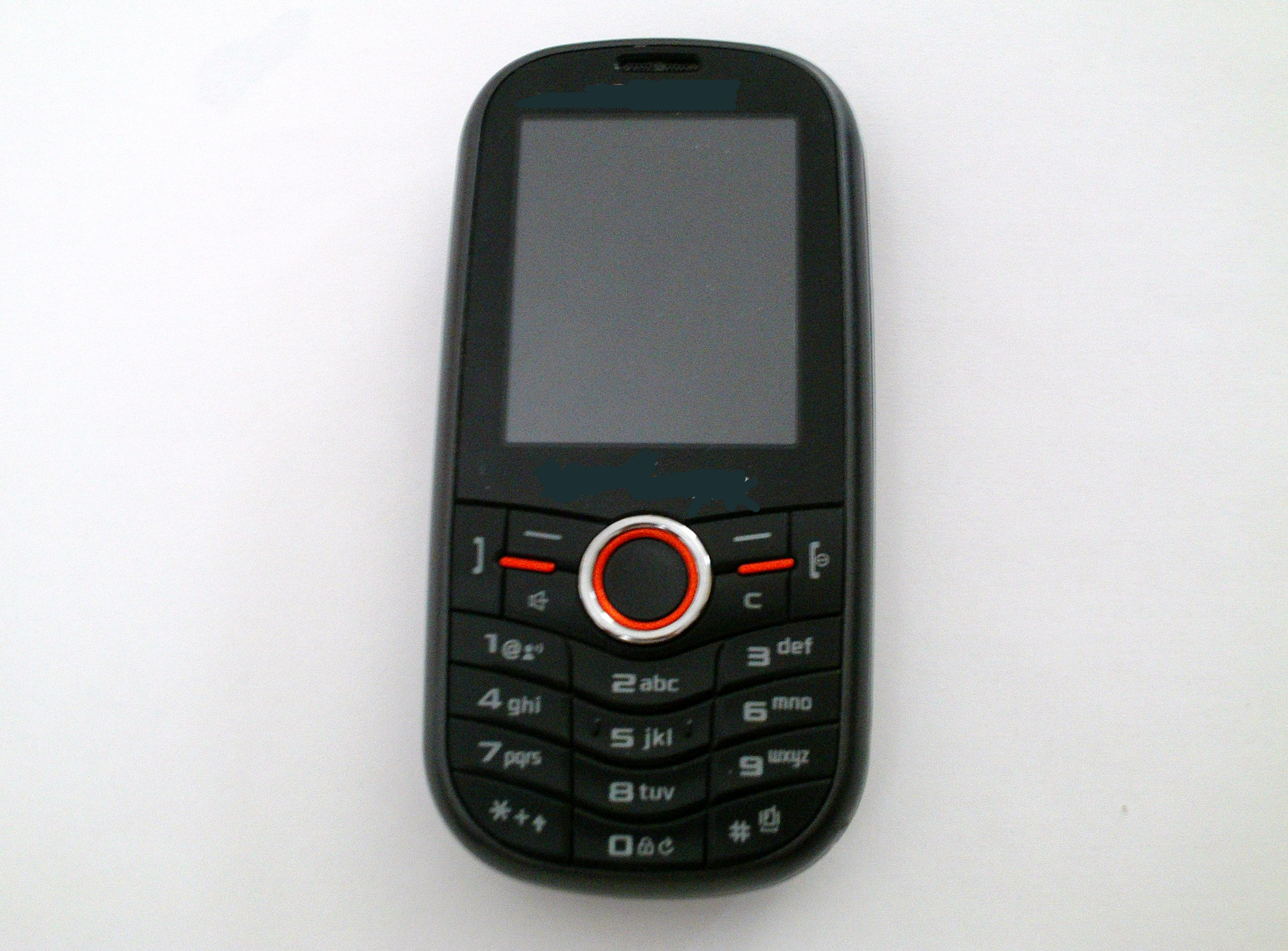
Samsung Intensity (SCH-U450), part of the series

The Samsung Intensity series is a line of mobile phone devices produced by Samsung Electronics, all of which are feature phones.

== Mobile phones ==
Date	Model	Alternative name
September 2009	Samsung Intensity (SCH-U450)	DoubleTake (Alltel)
July 2010	Samsung Intensity II (SCH-U460)	
July 2012	Samsung Intensity III (SCH-U485)	
