= Samsung Intensity =

Mobile phone model

Samsung SCH-U450
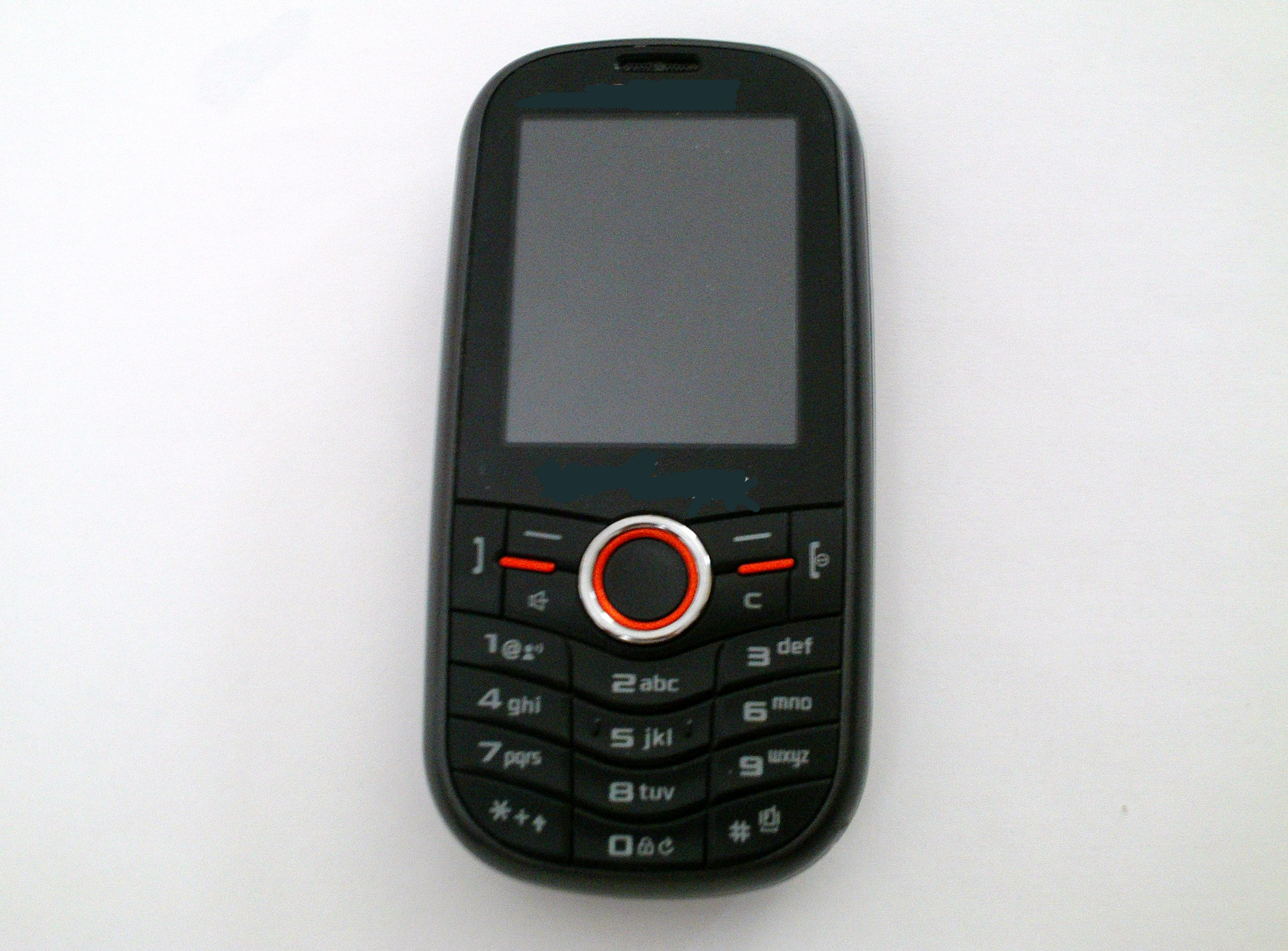
- SCH-U450 in Charcoal Black
- Manufacturer: Samsung Electronics
- Series: Samsung Intensity
- First released: 16 September 2009
- Successor: Samsung Intensity II (SCH-U460), Samsung Intensity III (SCH-U485)
- Compatible networks: Dual band CDMA2000
- Form factor: side-slider texting
- Dimensions: 4.25×2.08×0.65 in (108×53×17 mm)
- Weight: 3.53 oz (100 g)
- Operating system: Brew 3.1.5.145 Sp01
- Memory: 31 MB internal/ 16 GB external via SDHC
- Removable storage: microSD/microSDHC
- Battery: 960 or 1000 mAh Li-ion
- Rear camera: 1.3-megapixel
- Display: 2.1 inch
- Connectivity: Bluetooth 2.1
- Data inputs: QWERTY keyboard/numerical

Samsung SCH-U450 is a side-slider text messaging mobile phone. It was released September 16, 2009 to Verizon Wireless as the Intensity and on Alltel as the DoubleTake.

== Features ==
The features of SCH-U450 include: a QWERTY keyboard, Bluetooth, MP3 player, SMS, Mobile IM and emailing, and a 1.3 MP camera for photos only. Video filming is not supported. The phone comes in three different colors; flamingo red, black and blue. The phone also has a Micro SD card slot that is accessible by removing the back plate.
