= Magic4 =

Albanian Music Group

- Origin: Tirana, Albania
- Genres: Pop, Dance-pop
- Years active: 2007–present
- Members: Marsel Zadrima; Frensi Zadrima; Entela Zadrima; Vanina Çala
- Website: Instagram Official

Magic4 (also known as Magic 4, M4, or Magic Four) is an Albanian pop music group formed in Tirana, Albania, in 2007. . The band consists of two brothers, Marsel Zadrima and Frensi Zadrima, and their wives, Entela and Vanina.

They are recognized as pioneers of live Albanian music in the country's nightlife scene, bridging the gap between artists and the audience during a period when clubs were dominated by foreign DJ music and local performers were mostly confined to weddings or festivals.

== History ==
=== Formation and Early Years (2007–2008) ===
Magic4 emerged in May 2007 during a period when it was difficult to find instrumental or karaoke versions of Albanian songs. The group was supported by musician Robert Radoja, who provided orchestral tracks that the brothers adapted into karaoke versions.

They began performing at Chardonnay Club, introducing a new concept in Tirana: live performances over instrumental tracks, with lyrics displayed on screens so the audience could sing along. The idea quickly became popular, attracting both media attention and social network buzz. VIP guests and well-known singers often joined them on stage, breaking the traditional distance between performers and the audience.

Magic4 effectively reshaped the nightlife model in Tirana, which at that time was heavily influenced by foreign music and DJs.

=== Trend Hub for Albanian Composers (2008–2014) ===
As their popularity grew, Albanian composers began sharing their songs with Magic4, using the group's stage as a platform to promote new music in the capital's trendiest venues. Among these composers were Pirro Çako, Flori Mumajesi, Adi Hila, Dr. Flori (Florjan Kondi), and Françesk Radi.

During this phase, Magic4 performed as resident artists in some of Tirana's most popular clubs:

- Chardonnay (2007–2008)
- McMariot (2008–2011)
- Blackstone Club (2011–2014)

=== Professional Live Era (2014–2020) ===
By 2014, Tirana's club scene had modernized, and the demand for live performances increased. Magic4 transitioned from karaoke-style shows to fully live concerts with band arrangements.

They became resident artists at Tabu Club (2014–2020), a venue that became so synonymous with the band that many referred to it simply as "Magic4". This era also marked their transition into original music production, collaborating with composers such as Pirro Çako and Edlir Begolli.

=== Pandemic Interruption and New Phase (2020–present) ===
The COVID-19 pandemic (2020–2021) temporarily halted their activities, but post-pandemic they resumed performing as independent live artists in clubs, weddings, and festivals across Albania.

From 2021 to 2024, they performed at Magic Club, a venue named directly after them. Since 2024, they have been resident artists at Escape Premium Club, continuing their legacy of live performances.

== Television and Media ==
Magic4 have appeared widely on Albanian national television, including:

- a live medley of Albanian folk songs on Top Channel's E Diell in 2022
- interviews and performances on TV Klan's Zonë e Lirë
- appearance on Rudina talk show
- behind-the-scenes feature on their music video production
- a dedicated interview on Syri TV

== Musical Style ==
Magic4's musical style blends Albanian pop and Dance-pop with elements of emotional ballads, designed for live club audiences but adaptable to radio and streaming. Their songs feature:

- Catchy melodies and audience participation
- Modern, club-ready arrangements (produced by Edlir Begolli Alandy and others)
- Relatable lyrics about love, communication, and urban relationships

== Collaborations ==
Magic4 have collaborated with several notable Albanian composers and producers, including Pirro Çako, Edlir Begolli, Flori Mumajesi, Adi Hila, Dr. Flori, and Françesk Radi. These collaborations bridged the mainstream and live club scenes in Albania.

== Discography ==
- Aisha Dashnia (2018) – collaboration with Sabri Fejzullahu.
- Koka Ty Ta Boni (2019) – collaboration with Artjola Toska, regarded as a summer hit.
- Hape Telefonin (2019) – widely covered in Albanian media.
- Unë Po Vdes Për Ty (13 May 2022) – music by Edlir Begolli, lyrics by Marsel Zadrima; released via Fole Publishing.
- Në Ajër Më Le (27 June 2025) – Magic4 x Klement; music by Pirro Çako, lyrics by Marsel Zadrima; single and official video.
- Partizani (Remix) (2026) – a dance-pop remix; the official video description presents it as an Albanian counterpart to “Bella Ciao”.

== Recognition and Reception ==
Media outlets such as TV Klan, Top Channel, and ABC News have described Magic4 as among the key innovators of Albania's live music scene. Their role in integrating Albanian-language music into mainstream nightlife and sustaining club culture for nearly two decades has been noted as influential in shaping post-2000 Albanian pop performance trends.
