= OMA Instant Messaging and Presence Service =

Instant messaging protocol

The OMA Instant Messaging and Presence Service (IMPS) is an Open Mobile Alliance enabler for Instant Messaging and Presence. The Wireless Village consortium developed the first cut of the specifications. After Wireless Village was merged with OMA, its specs became OMA IMPS 1.0 specifications. Interworking between several operators IMPS platforms is being performed under a GSMA initiative that encourages interworking and deployment of Instant Messaging.

== IMPS clients ==
Nokia
the chat client is accessed via the "My Presence" menu
Sony Ericsson
called "My Friends"
Motorola
called "IM". The phones' chat clients are generally designed to be provider neutral, so you have to put in the Wireless Village server settings

If your phone doesn't have an inbuilt chat client, you might still be able to get a third-party chat application that runs on your phone's Symbian, Java ME, BREW, or other application environment. You need to get a chat client which is "Wireless Village compliant presence-enabled".

Note that it is still necessary for the operator to provide the IM service and/or one will have to connect to a third party server for connection with others for IM'ing.

== Compatible terminals ==
This is only a partial list.

- Nokia
  - 1680 classic, 2630, 3120c, 3220, 3500, 5300 express music, 3600 slide, 6020, 6021, 6120, 6220, 6230, 6230i, 6300, 6630, 6820, 5140, 6810, 7200, 7260, 7270, 7610, 8800, E50, E51, E60, E61, E62, E63, E65, E70, E71, E72, N70, N72, N73, N95
- Motorola
  - V500, V600, E398, V3, V3xx, ZN5
- Sony Ericsson
  - K310, J300i, F500i, K300i, K310i, K500i, K510i, K550i, K600i, K610i, K700i, K750i, K790i, K800i, K850i, S700i, T206, T630, T637, V800, W550i, W595, W200i, W800i, W810i, W850i, W880i, W900i, Z500A, Z750, Z800, Z1010
- Siemens AG
  - CX70, CX75, M65, SK65, S75
- BenQ-Siemens
  - S68, E71, EL71, M81

== See also ==
- Wireless Village
- Open Mobile Alliance - an industry consortium that manages the IMPS specification
