= Software Component Management Object =

Software Component Management Object (SCOMO) is an Open Mobile Alliance specification that allows a management authority to perform mobile device management on a remote device, including installation, uninstallation, activation and deactivation of software components over the air. It appears to have been in use between 2008 and 2013.

== See also ==
- Over-the-air programming – firmware update over the air (FOTA), Software Components OTA (SCOTA)
