= Wireless Session Protocol =

Wireless Session Protocol (WSP) is an open standard for maintaining high-level wireless sessions. The protocol is involved from the second that the user connects to one URL and ends when the user leaves that URL. The session-wide properties are defined once at the beginning of the session, saving bandwidth over continuous monitoring. The session-establishing process does not have long connection algorithms.

WSP is based on HTTP 1.1 with few enhancements. WSP provides the upper-level application layer of WAP with a consistent interface for two session services. The first is a connection-oriented service that operates above a transaction layer protocol WTP and the second is a connectionless service that operates above a secure or non-secure data-gram transport service. Therefore, WSP exists for two reasons: First, the connection mode enhances HTTP 1.1's performance over the wireless environment. Second, it provides a session layer so the whole WAP environment resembles the OSI Reference Model.
