= Enhanced Messaging Service =

Enhanced Messaging Service (EMS) was a cross-industry collaboration between magic4, Ericsson, Motorola, Siemens and Alcatel among others, which provided an application-level extension to Short Message Service (SMS) for cellular phones available on GSM, TDMA and CDMA networks. EMS is defined in 3GPP Technical Specification 3GPP TS 23.040 (originally GSM 03.40).

EMS was an intermediate technology, between SMS and MMS, providing some of the features of MMS. EMS was a technology designed to work with existing networks, but was ultimately made obsolete by MMS. An EMS-enabled mobile phone could send and receive messages that had special text formatting (such as bold or italic), animations, pictures, icons, sound effects and special ringtones. EMS messages sent to devices that did not support it would be displayed as SMS messages, though they may be unreadable due to the presence of additional data that cannot be rendered by the device.

In some countries, EMS messages could not generally be sent between subscribers of different mobile phone carriers, as they will frequently be dropped by the inter-carrier network or by the receiving carrier. However, in other countries, such as the UK, inter-carrier interoperability was generally achieved. EMS never really picked up due to interoperability limitations and in fact very few operators ever introduced it.

On June 9, 2008, the CTIA organization officially released an RFI for Enhanced Messaging implementation with focus on Group Messaging. The EM term in this context loosely refers to an improved mobile messaging product that combines the simplicity of Text Messaging with the successful rich features of the Internet's instant messaging. Other references to this new service have been made as "SMS 2" or "Instant SMS".

== See also ==
- Comparison of user features of messaging platforms
