= Wireless transaction protocol =

Mobile telephony standard

Wireless transaction protocol (WTP) is a standard used in mobile telephony. It is a layer of the Wireless Application Protocol (WAP) that is intended to bring Internet access to mobile phones. WTP provides functions similar to TCP, except that WTP has reduced amount of information needed for each transaction (e.g. does not include a provision for rearranging out-of-order packets). WTP runs on top of UDP and performs many of the same tasks as TCP but in a way optimized for wireless devices, which saves processing and memory cost as compared to TCP.

It supports 3 types of transaction:

1. Unreliable One-Way Request
2. Reliable One-Way Request
3. Reliable Two-Way Request
