= SyncML =

XML standard for information synchronization

SyncML, or Synchronization Markup Language, was originally developed as a platform-independent standard for information synchronization. Established by the SyncML Initiative, this project has evolved to become a key component in data synchronization and device management. The project is currently referred to as Open Mobile Alliance Data Synchronization and Device Management. The purpose of SyncML is to offer an open standard as a replacement for existing data synchronization solutions; which have mostly been somewhat vendor, application, or operating system specific. SyncML 1.0 specification was released on December 17, 2000, and 1.1 on February 26, 2002. The most recent development with SyncML has been related to MDM(Mobile Device Management), which has seen active development in 2019.

A SyncML message is a well-formed XML document that adheres to the document type definition (DTD), but which does not require validation.

== Internals ==
SyncML works by exchanging commands, which can be requests and responses. As an example:

- the mobile phone sends an Alert command for signaling the wish to begin a refresh-only synchronization
- the computer responds with a Status command for accepting the request
- the phone sends one or more Sync command containing an Add sub-command for each item (e.g., phonebook entry); if the number of entries is large, it does not include the <Final/> tag;
- in the latter case, the computer requests to continue with an appropriate Alert message, and the mobile sends another chunk of items; otherwise, the computer confirms it received all data with a Status command

Commands (Alert, Sync, Status, etc.) are grouped into messages. Each message and each of its commands has an identifier, so that the pair (MsgID, CmdID) uniquely determines a command. Responses like Status commands include the pair identifying the command they are responding to.

Before commands, messages contain a header specifying various data regarding the transaction. An example message containing the Alert command for begin a refresh synchronization, like in the previous example, is:

<?xml version="1.0"?>
<!DOCTYPE SyncML PUBLIC "-//SYNCML//DTD SyncML 1.2//EN" "http://www.openmobilealliance.org/tech/DTD/OMA-TS-SyncML_RepPro_DTD-V1_2.dtd">
<SyncML xmlns="SYNCML:SYNCML1.2">
 <SyncHdr>
  <VerDTD>1.1</VerDTD>
  <VerProto>SyncML/1.1</VerProto>
  <SessionID>1</SessionID>
  <MsgID>1</MsgID>
  <Target><LocURI>PC Suite</LocURI></Target>
  <Source><LocURI>IMEI:3405623856456</LocURI></Source>
  <Meta><MaxMsgSize xmlns="syncml:metinf">8000</MaxMsgSize></Meta>
 </SyncHdr>

 <SyncBody>
  <Alert>
   <CmdID>1</CmdID>
   <Data>203</Data>   <!-- 203 = mobile signals a refresh from it to computer -->
   <Item>
    <Target><LocURI>Events</LocURI></Target>
    <Source><LocURI>/telecom/cal.vcs</LocURI></Source>
    <Meta><Anchor xmlns="syncml:metinf"><Last>42</Last><Next>42</Next></Anchor></Meta>
   </Item>
  </Alert>

  <Final/>
 </SyncBody>
</SyncML>

The response from the computer could be an XML document like (comments added for the sake of explanation):

<?xml version="1.0"?>
<!DOCTYPE SyncML PUBLIC "-//SYNCML//DTD SyncML 1.2//EN" "http://www.openmobilealliance.org/tech/DTD/OMA-TS-SyncML_RepPro_DTD-V1_2.dtd">
<SyncML>
 <SyncHdr>
  <VerDTD>1.1</VerDTD>
  <VerProto>SyncML/1.1</VerProto>
  <SessionID>1</SessionID>
  <MsgID>1</MsgID>
  <Target><LocURI>IMEI:3405623856456</LocURI></Target>
  <Source><LocURI>PC Suite</LocURI></Source>
 </SyncHdr>

 <SyncBody>

  <!-- accept the header of the last message from the client -->
  <Status>
   <CmdID>1</CmdID>
   <MsgRef>1</MsgRef>
   <CmdRef>0</CmdRef>	<!-- 0 = header of the message -->
   <Cmd>SyncHdr</Cmd>
   <TargetRef>PC Suite</TargetRef>
   <SourceRef>IMEI:3405623856456</SourceRef>
   <Data>200</Data>	<!-- 200 = ok, accepted -->
  </Status>

  <!-- accept the request of the mobile for a sync -->
  <Status>
   <CmdID>2</CmdID>	<!-- this is command #2 -->
   <MsgRef>1</MsgRef>
   <CmdRef>1</CmdRef>	<!-- it respond to command msg=1,cmd=1 -->
   <Cmd>Alert</Cmd>
   <TargetRef>Events</TargetRef>
   <SourceRef>/telecom/cal.vcs</SourceRef>
   <Meta><Anchor xmlns="syncml:metinf"><Next>0</Next><Last>0</Last></Anchor></Meta>
   <Data>200</Data>	<!-- 200 = ok, accepted -->
  </Status>

  <Final/>
 </SyncBody>
</SyncML>

The transaction then proceeds with a message from the mobile containing the Sync command, and so on.

This example is a refresh where the mobile sends all its data to the computer and nothing in the other way around. Different codes in the initial Alert command can be used to initiate other kinds of synchronizations. For example, in a "two-way sync", only the changes from the last synchronization are sent to the computer, which does the same.

The Last and Next tags are used to keep track of a possible loss of sync. Last represents the time of the last operation of synchronization, as measured by each device. For example, a mobile may use progressive numbers (1, 2, 3, ...) to represent time, while the computer uses strings like "20140112T213401Z". Next is the current time in the same representation. This latter data is stored and then compared with Last in the next synchronization. Any difference indicates a loss of sync. Appropriate actions involving sending all data can be then taken to put the devices back in sync.

Anchors are only used to detect a loss of sync; they do not indicate which data is to be sent. Apart from the loss-of-synchronization situation, in a normal (non-refresh) synchronization, each device sends a log of changes since the last synchronization.

== SyncML client connectors and plugins ==
Name	Platform	Application	Contacts	Calendar	Memos	Tasks	Book-marks	E-mail	SMS	Photo	Video	Music	Files	Notes
Syncfriend for MS Outlook	Windows XP/Vista/7	SyncML and ActiveSync client for Outlook 2007/10	Yes	Yes										Also supports Google sync including feeds from Facebook, Twitter and LinkedIn. Free version synchronizes 200 contacts in any custom folder
Gemalto / O3SIS AG	Windows Mobile	SyncML Client, Personal Life Mobilizer	Yes	Yes	No	Yes	No	Yes	Yes	Yes	Yes	Yes		commercial, over-the-air installable client, Videos, Photo, Ringtones, SMS, MMS, as well
Gemalto / O3SIS AG	Android	SyncML Client, Personal Life Mobilizer	Yes	Yes	No	No	No	No	No	Yes	Yes	Yes		commercial, over-the-air installable client
Gemalto / O3SIS AG	iOS	SyncML Client, Personal Life Mobilizer	Yes	Yes	No	No	No	No	No	Yes	No	No		commercial, over-the-air installable client
Gemalto / O3SIS AG	Symbian, Series 60	SyncML Client, Life Mobilizer Push Mail Edition	Yes	Yes	No	Yes	No	Yes	Yes	Yes	Yes	Yes		commercial, over-the-air installable client
Gemalto / O3SIS AG	BlackBerry J2ME from OS 4.5, Nokia S40, Sony Ericsson J2ME	SyncML Client,	Yes	Yes	No	Yes	No	No	No	Yes				commercial, over-the-air installable client
SyncEvolution	Unix/Linux	Evolution, KDE/Akonadi, plain files, ...	Yes	Yes	Yes	Yes	No	No	No					free, command line, Genesis GUI frontend
libsynthesis	Linux, iOS	SyncML client+server engine library	Yes	Yes	Yes	Yes	Yes	Yes	Yes					Open-source, LGPL+EPL, DB backend via plugins or SQL, custom content formats possible
SyncEvolution	Maemo 5	system address book/Contacts, Dates	Yes	Yes	Yes	Yes	No	No	No					free, command line
SyncEvolution	OS X, iPhone	system address book	Yes	No	No	No	No	No	No					free, command line
Funambol	WINNER	Pocket PC, Smartphone	Yes	Yes	Yes	Yes	No	Yes	No	Yes				plus files in 'briefcase', AGPL v3
Funambol	Symbian	Symbian S60 3rd/5th Edition	Yes	Yes	Yes	Yes				Yes				AGPL v3, adds push and picture sync capabilities to native client
Funambol	Android	Android Sync Client	Yes	Yes	Yes	No	No	No	No	Yes				Open Source, AGPL v3; very specific to onemedia.com, attempts to use it with other SyncML servers have failed
Funambol	BlackBerry	BB Databases	Yes	Yes	Yes	Yes				Yes				Open Source, AGPL v3
Funambol	iOS	AddressBook	Yes											Open Source, AGPL v3
Funambol	Java Email Client	Java ME, J2SE	Yes					Yes						Open Source, AGPL v3
Funambol	Windows	Outlook	Yes	Yes	Yes	Yes	No	No	No	Yes				Open Source, AGPL v3
Funambol	OS X	Desktop	Yes	No	No	No	No	No	No	No				Open Source, AGPL v3
Funambol	Multi-platform	Java ME, J2SE, C++	Yes	Yes	Yes	Yes	*	*	*					Open Source SDK, AGPL v3
Funambol	Palm OS	Palm Databases	Yes	No	No	No		No	No					Open Source, AGPL v3, Community Project
Funambol Community Project	Windows, Linux	iPod	Yes	Yes	No	No	No	No	No					sync via cable, Open Source, AGPL v3
Funambol Community Project	Windows, Linux, Mac	Thunderbird, Sunbird	Yes	Yes		Yes	No		No					Open Source, AGPL v3
Funambol	Yahoo!, Google	Contacts, Calendar	Yes	Yes	No	No	No	Yes	No					Open Source, AGPL v3
Nokia	Symbian 9.x	Nokia S60 3rd/5th Edition native	Yes	Yes	Yes	Yes	Yes	No	Yes					MMS, too!
Synchronica	Windows Mobile	Pocket PC, Smartphone	Yes	Yes	No	Yes		Yes						emails, attachments and folders
Synchronica	Sun Java Systems Communication Suite	Sun Comms 4, 5 and 6	Yes	Yes	No	Yes		Yes						
Synchronica	Microsoft Exchange	2003 and 2007	Yes	Yes	No	Yes		Yes						Using OWA (WebDAV)
Synchronica	Lotus Domino	6	Yes	Yes	No	Yes		Yes						Using IMAP and CORBA
Synchronica	Google	Calendar, Contacts	Yes	Yes	No	No		Yes						
Synchronica	MSN/Hotmail/WindowsLive	Contacts	Yes	No	No	No		No						
Synchronica	Java Content Repository	Any JCR compatible server	Yes	Yes	Yes	Yes		Yes						JCR (JSR-170) back-end API
Synchronica	Palm OS	mobile devices	Yes	Yes	No	Yes		Yes						
Synchronica	OS X	iPhone	No	No	No	No		Yes						over the air (OTA) using IMAP/SMTP
TSync	Windows, Linux, OS X, *	Thunderbird	Yes	No	No	No	No	No	No					free, GPL
SyncML2iPhone	iPhone	iCal	No	Yes	No	No								free
MyTT	Symbian	S60 all version	Yes	Yes	Yes	Yes			Yes					free, support file upload/download, only Chinese version
MyTT	Windows Mobile	Pocket PC, Smartphone	Yes	Yes	Yes	Yes			Yes					free, support file upload/download, only Chinese version
MyTT	Windows	Outlook	Yes	Yes		Yes								free, only Chinese version
MyTT	MTK	25,26,28	Yes	Yes		Yes			Yes					
MyTT	Brew		Yes	Yes										
plan44.ch	iOS	iOS contacts and calendar, separate tasks and calendar	Yes	Yes	No	Yes								commercial, free contacts-only version
Synthesis	Android	Android databases, internal tasks and notes, Astrid Tasks, Alex Baker's Tasks, OI notes	Yes	Yes	Yes	Yes	Yes	No	Yes	Yes	Yes	Yes	Yes	commercial, multiple sync profiles, scheduling
Synthesis	Windows Phone 8	Windows Phone 8 contacts, calendar	Yes	Yes	No	No								commercial
Synthesis	Palm OS	Palm Databases	Yes	Yes	Yes	Yes	No	Yes	No					commercial, multiple sync profiles, scheduling
Synthesis	Windows Mobile	Pocket PC, Smartphone	Yes	Yes	Yes	Yes								commercial
Synthesis	Windows	Outlook, Outlook Express	Yes	No	No	No								commercial
Synthesis	Windows, Linux, OS X	SQL, ODBC, SQLite3, PlainText	Yes	Yes	Yes	Yes	*	*	*					Programming SDK w/API's in C, C++, Delphi, Java, & .Net
Synthesis	Windows, OS X	Sunbird/Lightning	Yes	Yes	No	No								DEMO application included with SDK
Synthesis	Windows, Linux, OS X	Client Desktop DEMO/ODBC/Plugin	Yes	Yes	Yes	Yes	*	*	*					Scriptable utility to connect with any other client side application or database.
TTSync	Windows Mobile	Pocket PC, Smartphone	Yes	Yes	Yes	Yes	*	*	*					commercial
TTSync	Symbian	S60, 1,2,3 version	Yes	Yes	Yes	Yes	*	*	*					commercial
CompanionLink	Windows	Various												commercial
SyncJE by Nexthaus	Windows Mobile	Windows Mobile	Yes	Yes	No	Yes								commercial
SyncJE by Nexthaus	OS X	OS X	Yes	Yes	No	Yes								commercial
SyncJE by Nexthaus	Windows	Outlook	Yes	Yes	Yes	Yes								commercial
SyncJE by Nexthaus	Windows	Outlook Express	Yes	No	No	No								commercial
SyncJE by Nexthaus	Windows	Lotus Notes	Yes	Yes	Yes	Yes								commercial
SyncJE by Nexthaus	Windows	ACT	Yes	Yes	No	Yes								commercial
SyncJE by Nexthaus	Palm OS	Palm Databases	Yes	Yes	Yes	Yes								commercial
SyncJE by Nexthaus	BlackBerry		Yes	Yes	No	Yes								commercial
SyncJE by Nexthaus	iOS	iPhone	Yes	No	No	No								commercial
Critical Path (Memova)	J2ME	Phone Backup Client	Yes							Yes	Yes	Yes	Yes	commercial
Voxmobili (An OnMobile Company)	Windows Mobile, Android, OS X, Symbian, J2ME...	SyncML Client, VoxMobili Client	Yes	Yes	Yes	Yes	Yes	Yes	Yes	Yes	Yes	Yes	Yes	commercial
Yota Contacts	Windows Mobile	SyncML Client, Address book	Yes											free, shipped with Yota HTC MAX 4G
Synchronoss	Blackberry, Symbian, Palm OS, Windows Mobile, Android	SyncML Client, MightyBackup, Network Address Book	Yes						Yes	Yes	Yes	Yes	Yes	commercial, with over 10 Million clients deployed
Synchronoss	Windows	Outlook Connector	Yes	Yes	Yes	Yes								
Synchronoss	Exchange	Microsoft Exchange Connector	Yes	Yes	Yes	Yes								
Pleex	Android, Bada, Blackberry OS, iOS, J2ME, Symbian (S60/S40/UIQ), Windows Mobile	Various	Yes						Yes	Yes	Yes	Yes	Yes	Media sharing and community networks too

== SyncML servers ==
Name	Platform	Application	Free?	Contacts	Calendar	Memos	Tasks	Book- marks	E-mail	Photo	Video	MMS	Files	SAN^{1}	Notes
Alt-N Technologies' MDaemon Email Server	Windows	SyncML Server	No	Yes	Yes	Yes	Yes								SMB email OTA mobile device sync
Group-Office	PHP	Data Synchronization but not Device Management	No	Yes	Yes	Yes	Yes		Yes						E-mail is synced with IMAP
Funambol	Java (Linux, Windows, OS X)	Data Synchronization and Device Management	Yes	Yes	Yes	Yes	Yes		Yes	Yes			Yes		Open Source, Java and C++ SDK, OEM & ISV Partners, AGPL v3
mySync DM	Java (Linux)	Data Synchronization and Device Management	No	Yes	Yes	Yes	Yes	Yes	Yes						Includes SMS backup on Android and Symbian platforms. Carrier-grade.
Synthesis	Windows, OS X, Linux x86	SyncML Server	No	Yes	Yes	Yes	Yes		Yes						SDK - (Java, C/C++, .Net API's), OEM & ISV Partners
syncgw	PHP	SyncML, CalDAV, CardDAV, ActiveSync Server	No	Yes	Yes	Yes	Yes	Yes				Yes		Yes	platform independent PHP SyncML server, OMA push service; Support for WebDAV (CardDav/CalDAV) and Exchange ActiveSync (EAS)
libsynthesis	Linux, iOS	SyncML client+server engine library	Yes	Yes	Yes	Yes	Yes		Yes						Open Source, LGPL+EPL, DB backend via plugins or SQL, custom content formats possible
Compelson	ASP .Net, IIS, SQL Server	SyncML Server	No	Yes	Yes	Yes	Yes								
IceWarp Messaging Server	Windows, Linux	SyncML Server	No	Yes	Yes	Yes	Yes		Yes						Enterprise Groupware
Winfonie mobile 2	Windows	Desktop SyncML Server (discontinued, no longer available)	No	Yes	Yes		Yes								Desktop SyncML server, connects with Microsoft Outlook, Lotus Notes, Lotus Organizer, Mozilla Thunderbird, Lightning, Tobit David, Palm Desktop, combit etc.
Synchronica	Java (Solaris, Linux, Windows, OS X)	Mobile Gateway	No	Yes	Yes	Yes	Yes		Yes						Service Providers, OEMS, Enterprise, supports OMA CP, OMA DS Push, OMA EMN and IMAP IDLE
Horde	Linux	Horde	Yes	Yes	Yes	Yes	Yes		No						Web Groupware, open source
Access NetFront Sync	Linux, Solaris	SyncML Server	No	Yes	Yes	Yes	Yes		Yes				Yes		Enterprise sync solution
eGroupWare	PHP	SyncML Server	Yes	Yes	Yes	Yes	Yes								Email uses IMAP, Open Source groupware
TimeMaker Server	Linux	SyncML Server	No	Yes	Yes		Yes		Yes						Leadership software. E-mail is synced by using integrated POP3/SMTP.

^{1}SAN = Server Alert Notification. This SyncML Push technology is based on definitions by the Open Mobile Alliance and extends the existing SyncML protocol specification by offering a method of server initiated synchronization.

== SyncML hosted services ==
Provider Name	Target Market	Price	Contacts	Calendar	Memos	Tasks	Bookmarks	E-mail	E-mail to SMS	SMS	MMS	WebDAV	CalDAV	Notes
Access NetFront Sync	Enterprise sync solution	commercial	Yes	Yes	Yes	Yes	Yes	Yes		Yes	Yes			SyncML standard sync server, has been deployed for Japan KDDI, China Telecom
AOL Sync Service (discontinued)	Consumer	free	yes	yes	No	No		yes						SyncML standard sync server
basota.com	Consumers	€10/year	Yes	Yes	Yes	Yes	Yes	No	No	No	No	No	No	
ComEase	cell phone backup													
CompanionLink	data synching of disconnected applications	commercial	Yes	Yes	Yes	Yes								
Compelson	demo	free	Yes	Yes	Yes	Yes								
Contails	Provides a one address book solution to contact management. Supports sync via mobile phones and several other services like mail and Instant Messengers.	Free	Yes											SyncMl based synchronization, webmail synchronization
GooSync	Beta	paid	Yes	Yes		Yes								Google Calendar Synchronisation
GSMSync		free / paid	Yes	Yes	Yes	Yes	Yes			Yes				
hotpim	Service Providers, Device Manufacturers, Enterprises	free	Yes	Yes	Yes	Yes				Yes				Support media file with self client,full-text search engine，only Chinese version
MemoToo	Consumer and business	free / paid	Yes	Yes	Yes	Yes	Yes*	No		Yes		Yes	Yes	Free services limited to 100 items stored for any category - OTA configuration, Photo for contact, Category support, Sortable tasks
MightyPhone	Brew Cell Phone Owners		Yes	Yes	No	No								limited client support
Keep		free	Yes	No	No	No	No	No	No	No	No	No	No	formerly: Everdroid
Mobilesynchro	cell phone backup	free / paid	Yes	Yes	Yes	Yes				Yes				SyncML based SMS synchronization, OMA/OTA configuration
myFunambol	consumer	demo	Yes	Yes	Yes	Yes	No	Yes		No	No	No	No	Tasks and notes can not be viewed or edited online
MyTT	Beta	free	Yes	Yes	Yes	Yes				Yes	Yes			Support media file with self client,full-text search engine，only Chinese version
O3SIS.com	Carriers and Service Providers, Enterprises, Retail, Device Manufacturers, Partners	commercial	Yes	Yes	Yes	Yes		Yes	Yes	Yes	No	No	No	Showcase available with OTA configurator, downloadable clients
O-Sync	Consumer	free	Yes	Yes	Yes	Yes				Yes				contact self-update feature
PhoneCopy	consumers, community	free/paid	Yes	Yes	Yes	Yes	Yes	No		Yes	Yes	No	No	All data can be viewed, edited or deleted online. Supports all platforms (Android, BlackBerry, Apple, Windows Phone, ActiveSync, Symbian, SyncML, ...).
picoBeat	consumer and SoHo	Development has halted and new users are not being accepted. Existing users can still use their account.	Yes	Yes	Yes	Yes								Elements can be edited online
PhoneBackup	Consumer	paid	Yes	Yes			No			No	No			OTA configuration
ScheduleWorld	consumer	paid (service shut down on November 30, 2010)	Yes	Yes	Yes	Yes	No	Yes	No	No	No	Yes	No	calendar sharing, multiple calendars, Google calendars, Email via Over The Air (OTA) provided by IMAP/SMTP
Social	Provides a one address book solution to contact management. Supports sync via mobile phones and several other services like GMail.	SERVICE CLOSED	Yes	No	No	No	No	No	No	No	No	No	No	SyncML based Contact synchronization. Outlook client, OTA configuration & downloadable clients.
Synchronica	Service Providers, Device Manufacturers, Enterprises		Yes	Yes	Yes	Yes	No	Yes	Yes	No	No	Yes	Yes	Live demo available with OTA configuration
Synkia	cell phone backup	paid	Yes	Yes	Yes	Yes				Yes				SyncML based SMS synchronization, OMA/OTA configuration, server alerted sync.
syncgcal.com	Google Calendar sync service	free / paid		Yes										Google Calendar Synchronisation (including shared calendars)
Syncfriend	A self updated phonebook. Supports multiple phones per each account. Automatic duplicate elimination.	Free	Yes	Yes										User friendly web interface. Not working.
Voxmobili(An OnMobile Company)	Provides a complete synchronization solution. Supports sync via mobile phones and PC clients.	commercial	Yes	Yes	Yes	Yes		Yes		Yes	Yes			SyncML based Personal Data synchronisation
Yota users, online community		free	Yes											Contacts management as a part of social network
MightyBackup		paid	Yes											commercial, with over 10 Million mobile clients deployed
Network Address Book	Service Providers, Enterprise	commercial	Yes											
MightyPhone	Brew Cell Phone Owners	paid	Yes	Yes	Yes	Yes								

== See also ==
- CalDAV
- CardDAV
- Critical Path SyncML Server
- iCalendar
- The SyncML Initiative
- Yahoo! Mobile and Yahoo! Calendar - Yahoo services offered in some countries that uses SyncML technology.
