= Open Mobile Alliance =

Mobile phone standards organization

- Abbreviation: OMA
- Formation: June 2002; 24 years ago
- Merger of: IPSO Alliance; March 27, 2018; 8 years ago
- Type: Nonprofit NGO
- Headquarters: San Diego, California, United States
- Members: Wireless vendors, information technology businesses, mobile operators, application & content providers
- Official language: English
- General Manager: Seth Newberry
- Staff: 143
- Website: www.openmobilealliance.org

The Open Mobile Alliance (OMA), briefly known as OMA SpecWorks, is a standards organization which develops open, international technical standards for the mobile phone industry. It is a nonprofit Non-governmental organization (NGO), not a formal government-sponsored standards organization as is the International Telecommunication Union (ITU): a forum for industry stakeholders to agree on common specifications for products and services.

== History ==
The OMA was created in June 2002 as an answer to the proliferation of industry forums each dealing with a few application protocols: WAP Forum (focused on browsing and device provisioning protocols), the Wireless Village (focused on instant messaging and presence), The SyncML Initiative (focused on data synchronization), the Location Interoperability Forum, the Mobile Games Interoperability Forum, and the Mobile Wireless Internet Forum. Each of these forums had its bylaws, its decision-taking procedures, its release schedules, and in some instances there was some overlap in the specifications, causing duplication of work.

Members include traditional wireless industry players such as equipment and mobile systems manufacturers (Ericsson, ZTE, Nokia, Qualcomm, Rohde & Schwarz) and mobile operators (AT&T, NTT Docomo, Orange, T-Mobile, Verizon), and also software vendors (Gemalto, Mavenir and others).

In March, 2018, it merged with the IPSO Alliance to form OMA SpecWorks. A few years later it renamed back to OMA.

Related standards bodies include: 3rd Generation Partnership Project (3GPP), 3rd Generation Partnership Project 2 (3GPP2), Internet Engineering Task Force (IETF) and the World Wide Web Consortium (W3C).

Its mission is to provide Interoperability of services across countries, operators and mobile terminals. The OMA only standardises applicative protocols; OMA specifications are intended to work with any cellular network technologies being used to provide networking and data transport. These networking technology are specified by outside parties. In particular, OMA specifications for a given function are the same with either GSM, UMTS, or CDMA2000 networks. Adherence to the standards is entirely voluntary; the OMA does not have a mandative role.. OMA members that own intellectual property rights (e.g. patents) on technologies that are essential to realizing a specification agree in advance to provide licenses to their technology on "fair, reasonable and non-discriminatory licensing" terms to other members. OMA is incorporated in California, United States.

== Standard specifications ==
The OMA maintains many specifications, including:

- Browsing specifications, now named Browser and Content, formerly named WAP browsing; in current version, these specifications rely essentially on XHTML Mobile Profile
- Multimedia Messaging Service (MMS) specifications
- OMA DRM specifications for digital rights management
- OMA Instant Messaging and Presence Service (OMA IMPS) specification, which is a system for instant messaging on mobile phones; formerly named Wireless Village
- OMA SIMPLE IM instant messaging based on Session Initiation Protocol (SIP) SIMPLE
- OMA CAB Converged Address Book, a social address book service standard
- OMA CPM Converged IP Messaging, the underlying enabler for Rich Communication Services
- OMA Lock and Wipe (LAWMO) specifications for those functions
- OMA Lightweight M2M (LwM2M) OMA LWM2M specifications for machine to machine functions
- OMA Client Provisioning (OMA CP) specification for provisioning
- OMA Data Synchronization (OMA DS) specification for data synchronization using SyncML
- OMA Device Management (OMA DM) specification for mobile device management using SyncML
- OMA BCAST specification for Mobile Broadcast Services
- OMA Rich Media Environment (RME) specification
- OMA OpenCMAPI Connection Management APIs
- OMA PoC specification for Push to talk Over Cellular (PoC)
- OMA Presence SIMPLE specification for presence based on Session Initiation Protocol (SIP) SIMPLE
- OMA Service Environment
- FUMO Firmware update
- Secure User Plane Location Protocol (SUPL), an IP-based service for assisted GPS on handsets
- Mobile Location Protocol (MLP), an IP-based protocol for obtaining the position/location of mobile handset
- Wireless Application Protocol 1 (WAP1), 5-layer stack of protocols
- OMA LOCSIP Location in SIP/IP Core
- Software Component Management Object (SCOMO), allows a management authority to perform software management on a remote device

The OMA specifications inspired or formed the base for the following:

- NGSI-LD is an API and information model specified by ETSI based (with permission) on OMA specifications NGSI-09 and NGSI-10, extending them to provide bindings and to formally use property graphs, with node and relationship (edge) types that may play the role of labels in formerly-mentioned models and support semantic referencing by inheriting classes defined in shared ontologies.

== See also ==
- Linux Phone Standards Forum (LiPS)
- LiMo Foundation
- Content Management Interface
- Open Handset Alliance
- Mobile Platform
- 3GPP
- European Telecommunications Standards Institute (ETSI)
- List of wireless router firmware projects
- Mobile Device Management
- List of Mobile Device Management Software
