= List of Kiosk software =

This is a list of kiosk software for interactive kiosks, including kiosk-exclusive software and mobile device management (MDM) software with kiosk features.

== General information ==
Name	Company	Supported platforms	Type
AirWatch	VMware	Android, iOS, macOS	MDM software
Amtel	Amtel	iOS	MDM software
AppSuite CMS	eyefactive	Windows	Dedicated kiosk software
BES12	BlackBerry		MDM software
Comodo	Xcitium	iOS, Knox	MDM software
Intune	Microsoft Corporation	iOS, Knox	MDM software
Linutop Kiosk	Linutop	Raspberry Pi, Ubuntu 14.04	Dedicated kiosk software
MaaS 360	IBM	Android, iOS, Windows	MDM software
ManageEngine	Zoho Corporation	Android, iOS	MDM software
Meraki	Cisco Systems	iOS, Knox	MDM software
MobileIron	MobileIron		MDM software
MokiTouch	MokiMobility	Android, iOS	Dedicated kiosk software
Netkey Kiosk	NCR Corporation		Dedicated kiosk software
Pandora FMS	Artica SL	Linux	MDM software
SiteKiosk Classic	Provisio	Windows	Dedicated kiosk software
SAP Afaria	SAP SE		MDM software
Welcome Station Kiosk	Bolt On Technology	Android	Dedicated kiosk software
XenMobile	Citrix Systems	KNOX	MDM software
