= Jamf =

U.S. technology company

Jamf Holding Corp.
- Type: Private
- Industry: Software development; Mobile device management; Endpoint security
- Founded: 2002; 24 years ago, in Eau Claire, Wisconsin, U.S.
- Founders: Chip Pearson; Zach Halmstad; Christopher Thon
- Headquarters: Minneapolis, Minnesota, U.S.
- Area served: Worldwide
- Key people: Beth Tschida (CEO)
- Products: Proprietary software
- Revenue: ▲US$627.4 million (2024)
- Operating income: ▼ -US$69.1 million (2024)
- Net income: ▲ −US${68.5} million (2024)
- Owner: Francisco Partners
- Number of employees: 2,700 (2024)
- Website: jamf.com
- Footnotes; Financials as of October 28, 2023

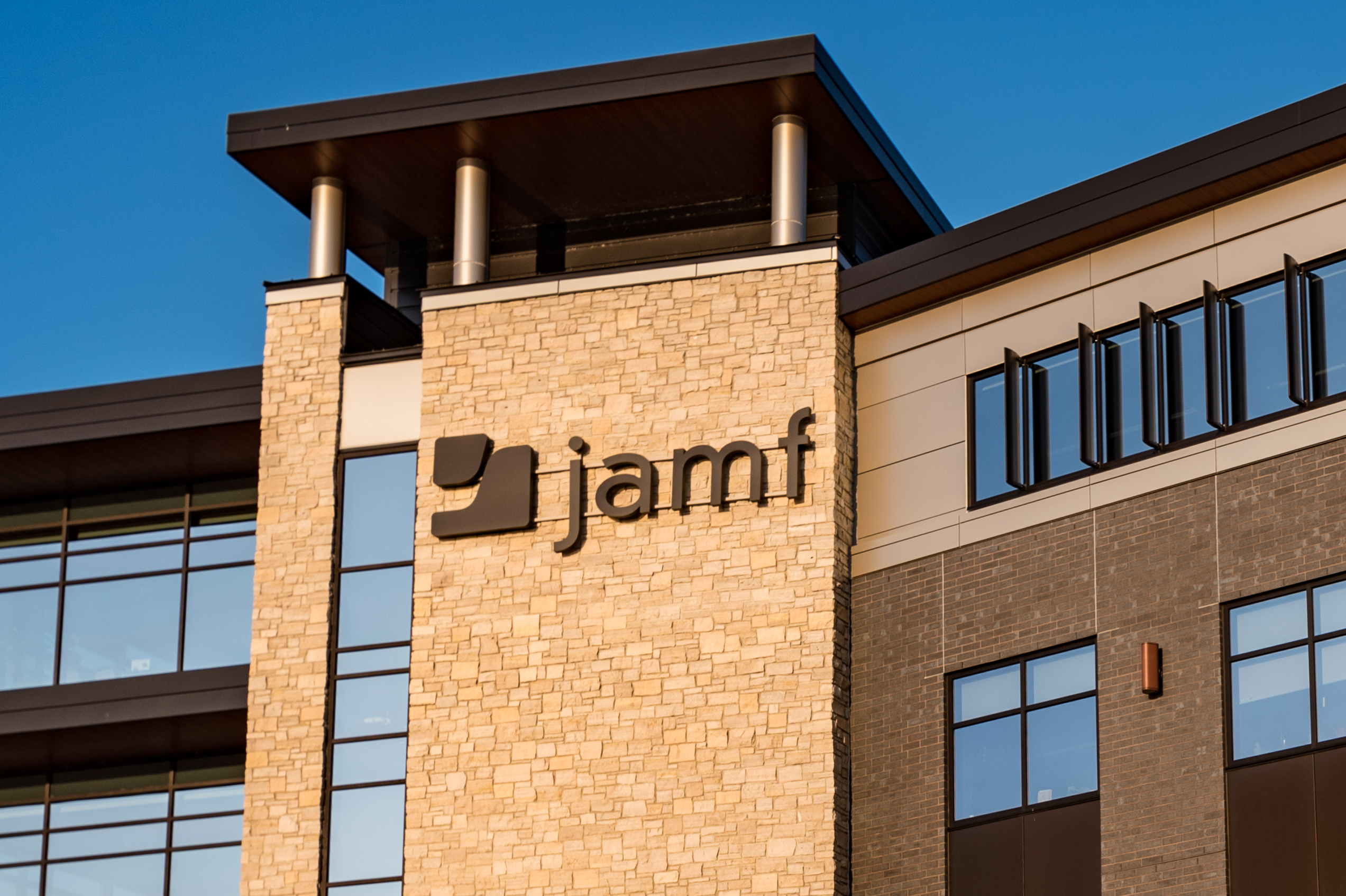
Jamf offices in Eau Claire, Wisconsin

Jamf Holding Corp. is a software company best known for developing Jamf Pro (formerly The Casper Suite), a mobile device management system primarily for macOS, iOS and iPadOS devices.

== History ==
Established in Eau Claire, Wisconsin, Jamf Software was founded by Zach Halmstad, Christopher Thon, and Chip Pearson, launching The Casper Suite in 2002. Currently based in Minneapolis, its name came from Laszlo Jamf, a character in Thomas Pynchon's novel Gravity's Rainbow.

As Apple continued to grow into larger environments, Jamf developed tools to make its devices work in corporate environments. In 2015, seven years after Summit Partners invested $30 million in the firm, Halmstad and Pearson were replaced by Dean Hager as CEO of Jamf.

Two years after IBM selected it to manage its Macs, The Casper Suite was rebranded as Jamf Pro in 2017. After Vista Equity Partners acquired the majority of its shares in December of that year, Jamf bought Orchard & Grove, ZuluDesk and Digita Security by 2019.

With the acquisition of the three aforementioned companies following the investment from Vista, Jamf expanded its product portfolio to include identity and authentication management, an education-specific MDM, and endpoint security built for Mac using user behavior analytics.

It raised $468 million with a successful IPO on Nasdaq in July 2020, valuing it at $4.6 billion. In May 2021, Jamf acquired zero-trust software vendor Wandera for $400 million. In April 2025, Jamf acquired Identity Automation for $215 million.

As of December 31, 2022, the company reported servicing approximately 71,000 active customers globally. Furthermore, Jamf's technology is deployed on roughly 30 million Apple devices worldwide.

By agreeing to be acquired by Francisco Partners for $2.2 billion in an all-cash deal in October 2025, Jamf expects to retain its name and headquarters following the deal close in Q1 2026. On January 30, 2026, it was announced that Francisco had completed the purchase of the company for the desired amount.

== Products ==
Unless otherwise noted, all Jamf products support macOS, iOS, iPadOS, and tvOS.

- Jamf Pro (mobile device management)
- Jamf Now (mobile device management)
- Jamf School (mobile device management): Previously ZuluDesk.
- Jamf Teacher
- Jamf Connect (identity management)
- Jamf Protect (endpoint security)
- Jamf Trust (zero trust VPN)
- Jamf Safe Internet (internet filter and endpoint security for schools)
- Jamf Private Access (zero trust security model)
- Jamf Data Policy (internet filter and data cap)

== Integration with Microsoft Intune ==
Jamf has a partnership with Microsoft that allows Jamf Pro to communicate with Intune. This partnership extended Microsoft Azure Active Directory, Azure Conditional Access, and Microsoft Intune to macOS. In 2020, the partnership expanded again to include iOS device compliance.

== See also ==
- List of Mobile Device Management software
- Unified Endpoint Management
- Enterprise Mobility Management
- Bring Your Own Device
- Mobile Application Management
