= Globo plc =

British software company

Globo
- Company type: Public
- Traded as: GBO.LN
- ISIN: GB00B282VW04
- Industry: Enterprise mobility management Mobile application development
- Founded: 1997
- Founder: Costis Papadimitrakopoulos
- Fate: Dissolved January 2017.
- Headquarters: London, United Kingdom
- Products: GO!Enterprise
- Revenue: $121 million
- Operating income: $43 million
- Net income: $40 million
- Number of employees: 470
- Website: Globo

GLOBO plc was a company that provided enterprise mobility management (EMM) and mobile application development (MADP) software and services. Globo was listed on the London Stock Exchange's AIM market (GBO: LN) "Share price information". Archived from the original on 2 February 2015. Globo acquired Notify Technology in October 2013, adding Mobile Device Management (MDM) capabilities to its EMM product offering and expanding its operations in the USA. In June 2014, Globo acquired Sourcebits, a designer and developer of apps.

On 23 October 2015, trading in Globo shares was suspended. On 26 October, CEO Konstantinos Papadimitrakopoulos and CFO Dimitris Gryparis resigned, having informed the board of directors about "certain matters regarding the falsification of data and misrepresentation of the company's financial situation". Globo stated that they would appoint an independent forensic accounting team to investigate allegations raised by Quintessential Capital Management, an American hedge fund. According to an official announcement of the Company on 26 October 2015, "Mr. Papadimitrakopoulos advised the Company that up to 22 October 2015 he has sold 42,049,655 shares of GLOBO plc". The company was dissolved in January 2017.
