= MobileIron =

American software company

MobileIron Inc.
- Type: Public (2014-2020)
- Traded as: Nasdaq: MOBL; Russell 2000 component
- Industry: Mobile Security, unified endpoint management, enterprise mobility management, mobile device management
- Founded: 2007
- Founders: Ajay Mishra and Suresh Batchu
- Fate: Acquired by Ivanti
- Headquarters: Mountain View, California, USA
- Key people: Simon Biddiscombe (President, CEO and Director); Ajay Mishra (Co-founder); Suresh Batchu (Co-founder)
- Revenue: US$205 million (2019)
- Number of employees: 959 (Q2' 2020)
- Website: mobileiron.com

MobileIron Inc. was an American software company that provided unified endpoint and enterprise mobility management (EMM) for mobile devices, such as multi-factor authentication (MFA). The company announced in September 2020 it was being acquired by Ivanti.

== History ==
The company was founded in 2007 by Ajay Mishra and Suresh Batchu and was headquartered in Mountain View, California. MobileIron was an early pioneer in mobile security and management for smartphones and tablet computers, such as iPhone, iPad, Android, and earlier mobile devices such as Symbian and Windows Phone.

During the five year period from 2009 to 2013, MobileIron was mentioned in trade press. It had its initial public offering (IPO) in 2014 on NASDAQ under the ticker symbol MOBL.

After its share price fell from $9 at the time of the IPO to below $4 in early 2016, the company's founding CEO Bob Tinker was replaced by Barry Mainz as CEO, but remained on the company's board of directors. Simon Biddiscombe was appointed CEO in October 2017.

== Products ==
MobileIron's software allows the security and management of mobile devices such as smartphones and tablet computers in an enterprise environment, as well as the secure mobile access to enterprise data. As of June 2015 it held about 9.2% of global EMM market share.

MobileIron was mentioned by trade press in 2015 and 2016.

As of 2016, MobileIron's principal competitors include Microsoft's Enterprise Mobility Suite. Other major EMM competitors are IBM, as well as SAP, Dell/VMWare and BlackBerry who entered the EMM market after their acquisition of previously independent vendors Sybase, AirWatch and Good Technology.

In January 2018, MobileIron partnered with Google Cloud to distribute Google apps through MobileIron’s EMM platform and to provide a secure enterprise applications and services portal.

== Acquisition ==
After announcement in September, on December 1, 2020 MobileIron was acquired by Ivanti for $872 million.
