= MokiMobility =

MDM platform and company

Moki
- Type: Private
- Industry: Software
- Founded: 2011
- Founder: Ty Allen, Thomas Karren, Eric Johnson
- Headquarters: San Antonio, Texas, United States
- Key people: Paul Salisbury (CEO)|Michael Girdley (chairman)
- Parent: Dura Software
- Website: https://moki.com/

Moki (formally known as MokiMobility) is a cloud-based mobile device management (MDM) platform and development company which specializes in single-purpose iOS, Android, and BrightSign devices. Moki's software allows companies to convert mobile devices like iPad, Android tablets, and BrightSign players into retail kiosks, mobile point of sale devices, digital signs, product displays, conference room schedulers, or retail sales terminals. Moki's cloud-based platform provides security, remote management and monitoring of the mobile devices and applications. Moki is headquartered in San Antonio, Texas.

== Background ==
Ty Allen, Thomas Karren, and Eric Johnson founded MokiMobility in late 2011.

In June 2012 MokiMobility launched MokiTouch, the first Android kiosk application with remote management. The company followed up the release with MokiTouch Pro, a more secure media content app, in October,

In October 2012 MokiManage became the first mobile device and application management platform built on the Google App Engine. Mokimanage, which uses Google App Engine's High-Replication Datastore and Task Queue API, enables remote management of application settings, application distribution, and device management for Android and iOS systems.

In February 2013 the company launched the MokiMobility Solution Center, an app directory for purposed tablet solutions.

In April 2013 MokiMobility raised $2 million in seed funding to expand their dedicated mobile device management platform and enhance end-point security. Investment firm Epic Ventures led the round with additional funding from Allegis Capital and Fusion-IQ.

In June 2018, Dura Software announced the acquisition of MokiMobility and changed the official name of the company to Moki, LLC. It was the first acquisition of Dura Software, a company formed by two veterans of the San Antonio tech scene, Michael Girdley as board chairman and Paul Salisbury as CEO. Dura Software is an entirely new type of software company with a unique model that acquires and operates B2B software companies with the intent to hold them long-term.

== Product ==
Moki is a cloud-based mobile device management platform which converts mobile devices like iPad, Android tablets and BrightSign players into single-purpose devices like kiosks, mobile point-of-sale, digital signs, product displays, conference room schedulers, or retail sales terminals. The company also provides security, remote management, and monitoring on specified mobile devices with purposed applications.

== Partnerships ==
In April 2013 MokiMobility partnered with Revel Systems, a San Francisco-based creator of iPad POS deployments for restaurants and retail stores. Revel is one of the first companies to build POS solutions on an iPad. Through the partnership, MokiMobility and Revel Systems will develop an iPad POS system that adheres to new PCI Security Council guidelines.

== Leadership ==
Paul Salisbury, a former Rackspace Hosting Inc. senior vice president of customer experience and service delivery operations, is CEO of Moki. Over the course of his career, Paul Salisbury has held various operational and customer success leadership roles at Procter & Gamble, Ernst &Young, and Dell.

Michael Girdley, managing director of the $20 million Geekdom Fund, which invests in early-stage startups, is a board member of Dura Software. Girdley also co-founded Codeup in San Antonio and serves as a partner at RealCo, a long-term accelerator, based at Geekdom in San Antonio.

Salisbury and Girdley co-founded the holding company in November 2017 after being introduced to each other by Graham Weston.
