= Angel's Burger =

Philippine fast-food burger chain

- Logo
- Type: Private
- Industry: Fast food
- Founded: November 19, 1997; 28 years ago
- Founders: Joseph Mojica; Vicky Mojica
- Headquarters: Parang, Marikina, Philippines
- Area served: Philippines
- Key people: Vicky Mojica (CEO); Cholo Mojica (President)
- Products: Hamburgers, sandwiches, hotdogs, beverages
- Revenue: US$134 million (2022)
- Number of employees: 2,000+ (2024)
- Website: angelsburger.com

Angel’s Burger is a fast-food chain in the Philippines best known for its long-running buy one, take one hamburger promotion. Founded in 1997 by husband and wife Joseph and Vicky Mojica, the brand has grown into one of the largest burger kiosk networks in the country, with more than 1,200 outlets nationwide.

== History ==
Angel’s Burger was established in November 1997 in Quezon City, Philippines. The founders, Joseph and Vicky Mojica, were former overseas Filipino workers who initially managed a franchise of another burger chain before deciding to create their own brand. The business was named after their third child, Angelica (“Angel”).

The couple started with a single roadside kiosk offering inexpensive hamburgers. Following early financial challenges during the Asian financial crisis, the Mojicas worked temporarily in the United States. A reported $10,000 slot machine win in Las Vegas provided the capital for the company’s revival and expansion after their return to the Philippines. Angel’s Burger later opened its operations to franchising in 2003, which led to rapid nationwide growth.

== Operations ==
Angel’s Burger primarily operates through franchise kiosks that sell hamburgers, cheeseburgers, and sandwiches at low prices. Most branches are small roadside stands designed for take-out service. The company maintains a centralized commissary and logistics system that distributes ready-made burger patties and other supplies to outlets across the country to ensure consistent product quality.

As of 2024, the chain employed over 2,000 workers. Angel’s Burger has also introduced online systems that allow franchisees to make payments electronically through local banking partners.

== Brand and market position ==
The brand is noted for its long-running "buy one, take one" hamburger promotion, which is a central part of its marketing approach. Its low-cost, kiosk-style model attracts customers such as students, workers, and commuters, and places Angel’s Burger within the Philippines’ budget fast-food segment.

The company’s red and yellow kiosks with simple signage are present in both urban centers and provincial towns. The brand is sometimes referred to in Filipino popular culture as the ‘burger ng masa’ (lit. 'burger for the masses'), reflecting its lower price point.

== Public image and media attention ==
In 2020, Angel’s Burger drew attention for its innovation during the COVID-19 pandemic. Two of its branches in Marikina City installed plastic barriers and small “slides” for contactless payment and food delivery, minimizing physical interaction between staff and customers. The design received positive responses on social media for promoting safety and convenience during community quarantine periods.

The company has also taken legal and public relations actions to protect its name and image. In 2020, Angel’s Burger filed a complaint against a social media user for spreading a staged photo misrepresenting its product quality.

== Trademark protection ==
In 2023, Angel’s Burger issued a public advisory after reports surfaced of a food stall in Dubai using its name and logo without authorization. The company clarified that it has no branches outside the Philippines and worked with authorities in the United Arab Emirates to address the unauthorized use of its trademarks.
