= Mobile Broadband Plus =

Wireless Internet

Mobile Broadband Plus (MBB+) is a term for wireless Internet access through mobile devices. Mobile Broadband Plus is distinct from traditional mobile broadband by featuring global Internet access, providing international mobile services without roaming charges.

== Development ==
Standards of Mobile Broadband Plus have been developed by telecommunication, mobile phone, and laptop computer manufacturers which includes virtual SIM and cloud SIM technology. Established in 2012, a group of specialists from uCloudlink has adopted cloud SIM as one of the MBB+ standards which provides a global network solution without roaming charges.

== High speed anywhere and anytime ==
In 2011, 90% of the world's population lived in areas with 2G coverage, while 45% lived in areas with 2G and 3G coverage. Mobile broadband uses the spectrum of 225 MHz to 3700 MHz. MBB+ is designed to address issues with connectivity, network capacity, application quality, and mobile network operators' overall inexperience with data traffic. The service of MBB+ covers the globe, normally in 100+ countries, providing high speed internet on the move with 3G and 4G connectivity.

== Roaming free ==
Through patented Cloud SIM technology, MBB+ taps into a world's worth of SIM cards that are located throughout the globe. It will find the most optimal local mobile network and the corresponding SIM card in the cloud SIM server via the internet, then starts to convert the local mobile connection into Wi-Fi signals. In this case, all the data resource are within "domestic" boundaries and saving the user from international charges.

== Secure access ==
WBB+ supports Wi-Fi encryption including WPA and WPA2.

== See also ==
- Broadband Internet access
- MiFi
- Mobile Enterprise
- Mobile device
- Mobile VoIP
