= SCIM =

SCIM may refer to:

- Sample Collection for Investigation of Mars, a Mars sample return mission concept
- Service capability interaction manager, a service orchestration component within the IP Multimedia Subsystem architecture
- Smart Common Input Method, an input method for POSIX-style operating systems
- System for Cloud Identity Management: see System for Cross-domain Identity Management
- System for Cross-domain Identity Management, a standard for managing user identities across Internet services
- Spinal cord independence measure, a functional score describing function deficits of patients with a Spinal cord injury
