= Amtel =

Amtel, Inc.
- Type: Private company
- Industry: Enterprise mobility management, Mobile device management, Telecom expense management
- Founded: 2004
- Headquarters: Santa Clara, California; United States
- Area served: Worldwide
- Products: Mobile device security and apps management (MDM), Telecom expense management (TEM)
- Website: amtelcorp.com

Amtel, Inc. is a telecommunications management company based in Santa Clara, California. Founded in 2004, the company provides cloud-based mobile device security and expense-management products.

== Operations ==
Amtel primarily focuses on providing integrated enterprise mobility management, telecom expense management (TEM), and secure messaging software as a service for enterprises. Amtel's cloud-based solutions are secured with SSAE 16 Type II-compliant hosting, offering the highest level of data security and reliability compared to other mobile device management (MDM) and TEM vendors.

Amtel's SaaS product for managing smart mobile devices allows organizations to manage mobile device security, mobile apps, and fixed telecom services from a web-based console.

== History ==
Amtel originally developed and marketed an integrated SaaS product for telecom and mobile life cycle management.

The company's MDM product for iOS (iPhone, iPad), Android (Smartphones, Tablets), Blackberry and Windows devices was launched in 2010. With this program, Amtel combined mobile device security management with mobile apps management into a telecom information management system (TIMS) platform.

The components of the system - [mobile device management], mobile expense management, and telecom expense management could be set up separately or managed together from a single Web based console.

On 16 April 2016, the business was acquired by Netplus, before being acquired later on by StoneCalibre.
