= Mobile enterprise =

A mobile enterprise is a corporation or large organization that supports critical business functions and use of business applications via remote work using Wireless mobile devices. In a mobile enterprise, employees use mobile devices to do any or all of the following: access email, manage projects, manage documents, provide customer relationship management, conduct enterprise resource planning, fill out invoices and receipts, accounting vouchers, work orders, purchase orders, etc. and manage a corporate calendar and address book. These are the most common applications though many other corporate mobile applications are being developed and used by organizations around the world.

A mobile enterprise generally implies aggressive use of mobile technology facilitated by Internet-based data transmissions. As long as wireless network connectivity is available, enterprise databases can be remotely accessed and updated from anywhere in the world, at any time, with any device equipped with a Web browser and by anyone with permission to access such services. A mobile enterprise leverages existing Internet infrastructure and TCP/IP installations. In a mobile enterprise, mobile clients are at parity with other traditional clients such as laptop and desktop computers. The emphasis is on expedient data interchange and communication; little or no emphasis is placed on the method of access.

== Benefits ==
A mobile enterprise is generally accepted to confer benefits in the areas of higher workforce productivity and employee satisfaction. Faster decision-making is another often cited benefit that results from employees having access to real-time data at the point of action, for example, during a meeting. Therefore, mobile knowledge workers (such as consultants) are one of the groups among employees which is equipped with mobile devices by their organization. However, the strategic adoption of mobile devices in enterprises often also requires a change management process. Use of mobile applications in the workplace can increase worker productivity by as much as 45 percent.

Security is not a major concern anymore, since critical data is stored on servers in highly secured data centers. The mobile devices are used as terminals for information access and updates only. TLS (see IETF RFC 5246) and its predecessor SSL (see IETF RFC 6101) security protocol is deployed between the web server and the web browser on the end user device. Lost devices is not a problem since both the data and the programs reside on the servers housed in the data centers and not on the mobile devices.

According to an article in CRM Guidebooks:

A recent Yankee Group survey “Anywhere Enterprise–Large: U.S. Mobility and Applications Survey” identified that businesses can realize the following advantages from mobile business apps:

- Increased field selling time: 28 percent
- Eliminated redundant activities: 27 percent
- Increased win rates: 26 percent
- Reduced sales calls costs: 25 percent
- Increased forecast accuracy: 25 percent
- Decreased administrative time: 24 percent
- Decreased sales cycle: 23 percent

== Disadvantages ==
The mobile enterprise depends entirely on the Internet as its infrastructure. The system breaks down when a user cannot connect to the Internet. The system does not work in places where Internet service is not available. The system is disrupted whenever the Internet suffers a disruption such as when underwater data cables are damaged by earthquakes as in the case of the 2006 Hengchun earthquake or 2008 submarine cable disruption in the Middle East that disrupted internet service between the Middle East and Europe.

The move to a more mobile, and dispersed, workplace is also resulting in changes to the definition of a successful employee. Some individuals, often called "self starters", can be highly effective working remotely without the influence of workmates or oversight of bosses in the same location. Others cannot, some even finding it difficult to start and complete projects without the social environment of the co-located workplace. Managers evaluating current and prospective employees must take these changes into account as they assign employees to their evolving mobile environments, attempting to match traits to workplace to maximize each employee's potential.

== Minimalistic approach ==
As with many mobile applications, bandwidth is an important consideration. A simple, minimalist design can reduce upload and download times, resulting in a better user experience.

== See also ==
- Unwired enterprise
- Enterprise mobility management
