= Athena Security =

American security firm

- Founded: 2018
- Founders: Lisa Falzone; Chris Ciabarra
- Headquarters: Austin, Texas
- Key people: Lisa Falzone, President; Chris Ciabarra, CTO; Michael Green, CEO
- Website: www.athena-security.com

Athena Security is an American security firm that develops Visitor Management and concealed weapon detection systems. Its technology uses Apple iPad, thermal imaging cameras, low-frequency electro-magnetic technology, and artificial intelligence to detect threats, potential crime such as mass shootings, and those who may have a history of crime.

== History ==
Athena Security was founded in 2018 by Lisa Falzone and Chris Ciabarra, both of whom co-founded Revel Systems in 2010. The first product created by Athena Security was a gun/weapon detection platform, inspired by the 2017 Las Vegas shooting and various school shootings. By 2019, the system was installed in more than 50 schools, malls, and other businesses and is now no longer sold by Athena Security. Athena has now been inspired by Homeland Security and has built controls around the Security Screening Process for concealed weapons detection.

== Products ==
Athena Security designs concealed weapon detection systems with visitor management systems. Its Weapons Detection System is designed with a metal detector which is made by CEIA, Apple iPad which is made by Apple, lidar sensors. These devices combined detect threats and human error and also send video feeds to law enforcement if a threat (such as a concealed threat of a gun) is detected. The system can also broadcast loud messages alerting active shooters that authorities are in route to the location. It works as a standalone system or can be used along with existing surveillance systems.

During the start of the COVID-19 pandemic, the company transitioned gun detection technology into detecting elevated temperatures to combat the spread of the virus. Thermal imaging is used to scan over 2,000 people per hour who walked past the system, with an accuracy rate of within .2 degrees Celsius.

In May 2022, the company pivoted and released a walk through metal detector system (powered by CEIA) that detects threats faster than legacy metal detectors. It uses sensors, thermal imaging, low-frequency electro-magnetic technology, and artificial intelligence to detect threats. The system can scan approximately one person per second without the need for them to remove items from their persons such as phones, belts, or jewelry. The System uses best practices by Homeland Security to help officers run their entryway screening check point.
