= List of mobile device management software =

This is a list of notable mobile device management software.

== General information ==
Name	Company	Supported desktop platforms	Supported mobile platforms	tvOS supported	Implementation
Apple Business Essentials	Apple	macOS, iOS, iPadOS, tvOS	iOS	Yes	Cloud
BlackBerry Unified Endpoint Manager	Blackberry	macOS, Windows 10	BlackBerry, Android, iOS, Windows Phone	No	On-premises, Cloud
Google Workspace (formerly G Suite)	Google	Windows 10	Android, iOS	No	Cloud
Ivanti	Ivanti	Linux-based OS, Windows, macOS	BlackBerry, Android, iOS, Windows Phone	No	Cloud
Jamf Pro	Jamf	macOS	iOS, iPadOS	Yes	On-premises, Cloud
Knox Manage	Samsung	Windows 10	Android, iOS	No	Cloud
LANrev	LANrev	Linux-based OS, Windows, macOS	iOS	No	Cloud
LogMeIn Resolve	GoTo	macOS, Windows	Android, iOS, iPadOS	No	Cloud
MaaS360	IBM	Windows, macOS	BlackBerry, Android, iOS, Windows Phone, Symbian	Yes	Cloud
Microsoft Endpoint Manager (layer on top of Intune and Microsoft Configuration Manager)	Microsoft	Windows, macOS	Android, iOS, Windows Phone	No	Cloud
Microsoft Intune	Microsoft	Windows, macOS, Linux-based OS, ChromeOS	Android, iOS	No	Cloud
MobileIron	MobileIron	Windows, macOS	BlackBerry, Android, iOS, Windows Phone, Symbian	Yes	On-premises, Cloud
Workspace ONE UEM (formerly AirWatch)	Omnissa (formerly VMware)	macOS, Windows, Chromebook	Android, BlackBerry, iOS, Symbian, Windows Phone	Yes	On-premises, Cloud
Prey	Prey	Windows, macOS	Android, iOS	No	Cloud
XenMobile	Citrix Systems	macOS, Windows	BlackBerry, Android, iOS, Windows Phone, Symbian	No	On-premises, Cloud

== Discontinued ==
These are the discontinued Mobile Device Management solutions:

- Good Technology - acquired by BlackBerry on November 2, 2015.
- Parallels MDM - sales ended on August 31, 2016 but the support is extended up to August 31, 2017.
- SAP Afaria MDM - sales ended on August 31, 2016 but the support is extended up to August 31, 2017.
