= Lisa Falzone =

American businesswoman

- Education: Stanford University
- Occupation: Company Founder

Lisa Falzone is an American businesswoman who is a co-founder of Revel Systems POS with Chris Ciabarra, an iPad point of sale company that she raised over 100 million dollars. Falzone also co-founded Athena Security, a temperature detection and a walk-through metal detector company that she raised over 16 million dollars.

Falzone has been recognized as a young female entrepreneur, through Fortune ’40 Under 40’ the Business Insider “30 Most Important Women Under 30 In Tech.” and the San Francisco Business Times ’40 Under 40.’

== Education ==
Falzone graduated from Stanford University in 2007. She swam three seasons for Stanford, scoring points at the Pac-10 championships in all three seasons and winning two conference titles as a member of the Cardinal swimming program in 2004 and 2005.

== Career ==
Falzone’s first job was teaching swimming lessons.

Falzone and Chris Ciabarra founded Revel Systems, a company that makes iPad point of sale systems, in 2010. Falzone became CEO of the company. In February 2017, private equity firm Welsh, Carson, Anderson & Stowe bought out Falzone.

In 2014, Falzone was recognized by Business Insider as one of the 30 Most Important Women Under 30 in Tech and Forbes Magazine recognized her in its 30 under 30 awards as well.
