= Chris Ciabarra =

American businessman

Christopher Ciabarra
- Education: Kutztown University of Pennsylvania, Alvernia University
- Occupation: Chief Technical Officer
- Employer: Athena Security

Christopher Ciabarra is an American businessman who is the co-founder and former chief technology officer of Revel Systems which Ciabarra exited shortly after the company got a 500m evaluation. Ciabarra help raise over 100m in funding at Revel. Revel was a manufacturer of point-of-sale systems which Ciabarra created on the Apple iPad. Ciabarra founded Athena Security INC with Lisa Falzone after they sold their first company to private equity. Ciabarra also created Network Intercept, a Los Angeles security software firm. Ciabarra has provided Internet security advice worldwide and to the United States Department of Homeland Security. Ciabarra in 2018 co-founded Athena Security INC which has created a "Gun Detection System" to help save student lives around the world from active shooter situations. Ciabarra has also created at Athena: Temperature Checking System and a Walk Through Metal Detector to maintain public safety.

== Early life and education ==
Ciabarra's entrepreneurial roots go back to the age 16, selling candy out of his backpack in high school and in college he fixed and sold websites. He earned his Bachelor of Science in computer science in 2000 from Kutztown University of Pennsylvania. He received his Master of Business Administration in 2004 from Alvernia University.

== Career ==
Ciabarra founded Network Intercept, a security software firm based in Los Angeles. At Network Intercept, he served as president, CEO, and security specialist.

Ciabarra designed Interceptor.net, Scan-on-the-Go Secure, Adrenaline cell phone app, and Nano-stealth. He has worked in the anti-hacker field and with PCI compliance.

Ciabarra founded Revel Systems with Lisa Falzone in 2010. Ciabarra developed the technology behind Revel’s iPad Point of sale and led the technological advancements as well as oversee data security of the system while employed at Revel. Ciabarra designed Revel Ethernet Connect, which provides failover connections between Wi-Fi and Ethernet. In 2016, Revel Systems was named the Leading iPad Point of Sale Company during Apple’s Q4 Financial Results Conference Call.

Ciabarra co-founded a team at Athena Security with Lisa Falzone which created a Gun Detection platform which pivoted to Temperature Detection that is in American hospitals, airports and businesses.

== Other activities ==
Ciabarra is a certified thermographer for Temperature Detection Systems, he is a member of Forbes Technology Council and the International Frozen Yogurt Association. He has worked with the Evian Group in their efforts to prevent protectionism and collapse of trade. Ciabarra has written for publications in the technology and marketing industries including Payments Source. Ciabarra is also a licensed Pyrotechnic Special Effects Operator in Texas.
