= Chip Pearson =

American entrepreneur and business executive

Chip Pearson is an American entrepreneur and business executive. He is best known as a founder and former CEO of JAMF Software. Pearson is a longtime resident of St. Paul, Minnesota.

== Early life ==
Pearson was born in Eau Claire, Wisconsin.

== Career ==
He co-founded JAMF Software (now Jamf) with Zach Halmstad in 2002. At the time Pearson owned an IT services company that could use the work being done by Halmstad at the University of Wisconsin-Eau Claire to streamline information technology administration. Those tools became a product known as Casper, sold by a company formed to support the product called Jamf Software.

== Jamf Software ==
Pearson ran Jamf with Halmstad until 2016, taking $30 Million in Venture capital financing from Summit Partners. Pearson and Halmstad recruited and hired Dean Hager as the CEO prior to leaving the organization. In 2017, Jamf was acquired by Vista Equity Partners and the founders departed the company.

Prior to selling Jamf, the organization generated over $52 million in annual revenue, served more than 5,500 customers, had nearly 500 employees, and had just opened its eighth global office. At that point, JAMF had an estimated valuation of $225 million. Since the sale, Jamf has grown to over 1,500 employees. Jamf is now traded on NASDAQ under the symbol JAMF.

Following Jamf, Pearson was involved in the 2017 project DocuMNtary about software companies in Minnesota. He also runs the Minnesota investment firm Bootstrappers and served on the Board of Directors at software companies like When I Work and Kipsu.
