= Imperial Multimedia =

Kiosk developer in Wisconsin, US

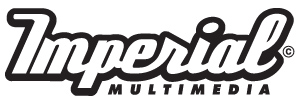
Logo of Imperial Multimedia. Established in 1999.

Imperial Multimedia is a developer of interactive kiosks based in Baraboo, Wisconsin, United States, The company was established by Fred Lochner in 1999. One of the main goals and initiatives of Imperial Multimedia is to get children into the outdoors and to arm them with information that will take away "the fear of the unknown".

== History of Imperial Multimedia ==
The company was founded in 1999 by Fred Lochner, in Baraboo, Wisconsin

In 2005, Imperial Multimedia took on a kiosk project in Cedar Rapids, Iowa. The New Bohemia Solar Project is a collaboration between Iowa DNR, I-Renew, Alliant Energy, Thorland Company, and the City of Cedar Rapids, with funding provided by the United States Department of Energy. The purpose of this project was not only to provide 7200 watts of solar energy for Cedar Rapids' existing grid, but also to raise awareness and educate the public about the existence and benefits of solar energy.

In 2006 Imperial Multimedia created an idea of getting people more information about a place they are visiting with the use of technology. In 2007, this idea came to fruition as Imperial Multimedia became the first company to install a state-wide system of electronic Information Stations in state parks. The interactive kiosks were installed in 31 of Virginia's State Parks. These Information Stations include a variety of information such as video tours of trails, printable maps, emergency information, park information and interpretive information.

In 2009, Imperial Multimedia developed a kiosk in northern Wisconsin in part of the Chequamegon National Forest that educated people about the local elk population. The electronic information kiosk was created to fit into an existing sign board. The electronic kiosk has in-depth information about elk and the surrounding wildlife.

In the beginning of 2010, Imperial Multimedia became a founding partner for the America's State Parks Alliance. The Alliance expresses advocacy for getting out in nature and making sure that state park visitor's voices are heard.
