= Zach Halmstad =

American business executive and entrepreneur

- Born: Eau Claire, Wisconsin, United States
- Education: University of Wisconsin-Eau Claire
- Occupation(s): Founder, CEO of JAMF Software
- Years active: 2003–present

Zach Halmstad is an American entrepreneur and business executive. He is best known as the founder and former CEO of JAMF Software.

== Biography ==
Halmstad is a longtime resident of Eau Claire, Wisconsin and a graduate of North High School and the University of Wisconsin-Eau Claire, where he studied music and computer science. Halmstad co-founded JAMF Software (now Jamf) with Chip Pearson in 2002. His work in the University of Wisconsin-Eau Claire’s IT department fueled an interest in streamlining information technology administration.

The tools he created to efficiently setup and maintain computers at UW-Eau Claire became the foundation and motivation to start Jamf. Halmstad ran Jamf with Pearson, taking $30 Million in Venture capital financing from Summit Partners. In 2017, Jamf was acquired by Vista Equity Partners and Halmstad and co-founder Chip Pearson left the company.

Prior to selling Jamf, Halmstad was quoted as stating that "Jamf generates over $52 million in annual revenue, serves more than 5,500 customers, has nearly 2,000 employees, and just opened its eighth office around the world. JAMF has received an estimated valuation of $225 million." Since the sale, Jamf has grown to over 1,500 employees. Jamf is now traded on NASDAQ under the symbol JAMF.

Halmstad was involved in two hotel renovations in downtown Eau Claire - The Lismore and The Oxbow - and, with musician Justin Vernon, helped raise funds for a performance center.
