= Mobile content management system =

A mobile content management system (MCMs) is a type of content management system (CMS) capable of storing and delivering content and services to mobile devices, such as mobile phones, smart phones, and PDAs. Mobile content management systems may be discrete systems, or may exist as features, modules or add-ons of larger content management systems capable of multi-channel content delivery. Mobile content delivery has unique, specific constraints including widely variable device capacities, small screen size, limitations on wireless bandwidth, sometimes small storage capacity, and (for some devices) comparatively weak device processors.

Demand for mobile content management increased as mobile devices became increasingly ubiquitous and sophisticated. MCMS technology initially focused on the business to consumer (B2C) mobile market place with ringtones, games, text-messaging, news, and other related content. Since, mobile content management systems have also taken root in business-to-business (B2B) and business-to-employee (B2E) situations, allowing companies to provide more timely information and functionality to business partners and mobile workforces in an increasingly efficient manner. A 2008 estimate put global revenue for mobile content management at US$8 billion.

== Key features ==
=== Multi-channel content delivery ===
Multi-channel content delivery capabilities allow users not to manage a central content repository while simultaneously delivering that content to mobile devices such as mobile phones, smartphones, tablets and other mobile devices. Content can be stored in a raw format (such as Microsoft Word, Excel, PowerPoint, PDF, Text, HTML etc.) to which device-specific presentation styles can be applied.

=== Content access control ===
Access control includes authorization, authentication, access approval to each content. In many cases the access control also includes download control, wipe-out for specific user, time specific access. For the authentication, MCM shall have basic authentication which has user ID and password. For higher security many MCM supports IP authentication and mobile device authentication.

=== Specialized templating system ===
While traditional web content management systems handle templates for only a handful of web browsers, mobile CMS templates must be adapted to the very wide range of target devices with different capacities and limitations. There are two approaches to adapting templates: multi-client and multi-site. The multi-client approach makes it possible to see all versions of a site at the same domain (e.g. sitename.com), and templates are presented based on the device client used for viewing. The multi-site approach displays the mobile site on a targeted sub-domain (e.g. mobile.sitename.com).

=== Location-based content delivery ===
Location-based content delivery provides targeted content, such as information, advertisements, maps, directions, and news, to mobile devices based on current physical location. Currently, GPS (global positioning system) navigation systems offer the most popular location-based services. Navigation systems are specialized systems, but incorporating mobile phone functionality makes greater exploitation of location-aware content delivery possible.

== See also ==
- Mobile Web
- Content management
- Web content management system
- Enterprise content management
- Apache Mobile Filter
