= Good Technology =

American cybersecurity company

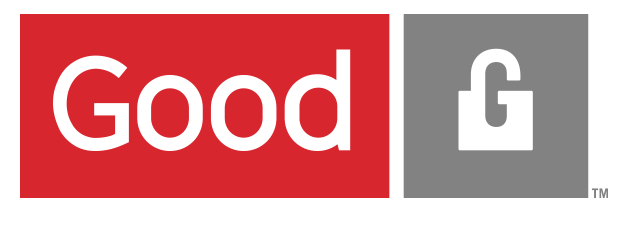
- Type: Subsidiary
- Industry: Software
- Founded: 1996
- Headquarters: Sunnyvale, California
- Parent: BlackBerry Limited
- Website: www.good.com

Good Technology, owned by BlackBerry Limited, is a mobile security provider headquartered in Sunnyvale, California, United States. The company serves more than 5,000 organizations worldwide in industries such as financial services, healthcare, manufacturing, energy and utilities, legal, government, and technology. Good makes products for managing and securing mobile devices in a business environment. The company focuses on securing apps and data on mobile devices.

== History ==
Good Technology in its current form is a continuation of two previous companies. One was Visto, founded in 1996 (and initially known as Roampage). Visto acquired the original Good Technology in 2009, and assumed its name. The original Good Technology had been founded in 2000; it was initially known as SpringThings, and sold an MP3 player for the Handspring Visor before shifting to email products for mobile professionals.

Prior to the acquisition, both companies marketed email access from portable devices. In November 2006, Motorola announced plans to acquire Good Technology as part of its plan to compete with Research in Motion's BlackBerry product line in the enterprise sector, and expressed its intention to continue licensing its technology to other phone manufacturers. At the time of the acquisition, Good's flagship products were Good Mobile Messaging, Good Mobile Intranet and Good Mobile Defense; the company had 470 employees.

On February 23, 2009, Motorola announced that it had agreed to sell Good Technology to rival push email provider, Visto. In 2009 Visto announced that it had renamed itself Good Technology effectively taking the name of the former independent company.

From 2009 to 2012, Good Technology grew through acquisitions, among them Intercasting Corporation (May 2009) and CloudSync (January 2010), Copiun (2012), and AppCentral (2012).

In December 2009 Good Technology began supporting iPhone and Android devices. The company launched Good Dynamics, a set of mobile application development tools for enterprise and consumers, in October 2011.

With the Good Secure Mobility Solution, released in June 2013, Good Technology aimed to address real-world usage in which professionals use several apps to accomplish a task. Building on its app containerization approach and the Good Dynamics platform, the company presented a system that was both secure and responsive to customers’ usage habits.

In September 2013 the company's "Good for Enterprise (GFE)" solution became the first cross-platform mobile collaboration solution to achieve Common Criteria Evaluation Assurance Level 4 Augmented (EAL4+) and the only containerized solution to meet this level of security certification on either iOS or Android.

In February 2014, Good Technology acquired BoxTone for its Mobile Device Management, Enterprise Mobility Management, Mobile Service Management and Mobile App Performance Monitoring Solutions.

On September 4, 2015 BlackBerry announced that it would acquire Good Technology for $425 Million dollars. The news of the acquisition was confirmed by Good Technology CEO Christy Wyatt in a blog post on the Good Blog. The acquisition was completed on November 2, 2015. The fire sale was controversial because Good Technology was valued at $1 billion and had filed for an IPO in May 2014, and in early 2015 the company's board had turned down an all-cash offer of $800 million. The valuation of Good Technology has been suggested to be inflated, and though the company reported 2014 revenue of $211.9 million compared to 2013 revenue of $160.4 million, with a 2014 operating loss of $83.9 million loss compared to the 2013 and 2012 operating losses of $115.9 million and $89.4 million, the 2014 filing showed the company had $42.1 million which was less than 12 months worth, and that cash had dwindled to under $25 million by the start of 2015. The employees' common stock at the time of the acquisition by BlackBerry was worth only 44 cents per share (around 10 percent of what it had been the previous year) while preferred stock for executives and venture capitalists was $3 per share; furthermore employees had been taxed on the common share value when it reached its peak (as they were leaving the company).

In late 2016 Sunnyvale headquarters office was closed, all remaining employees were moved to the BlackBerry office located in Mountain View.

In 2017 all Good Technology products were rebranded under the BlackBerry Software brand.

== Platform and products ==
The Good Dynamics Secure Mobility Platform serves as a foundation for the Good Collaboration Suite, and also for the Good Mobile Alliance ISV Ecosystem, in which independent developers create and distribute apps of their own. In October 2013 Good announced the Good Dynamics Shared Service Framework as part of Good Dynamics, including services such as printing,file sharing, and email. The framework is also designed to make it easier for developers to reuse code and connect apps. Good also announced Direct Connect in fall 2013; this technology enables companies to control the way data flows through their networks, for instance with respect to corporate or national boundaries.

The Good Collaboration Suite includes email, calendar, contacts, tasks, instant messaging, browsing and document sharing features that go beyond the consumer-oriented features of iOS, Windows Phone or Android, and are more tightly integrated with one another. It also includes business-oriented features such as single sign-on, secure access to corporate networks, and administrative functions. Good for Enterprise, the core component of the Collaboration Suite, provides a strict separation between personal and corporate content, allowing both to coexist on an employee's device without compromising security. Other components of the Collaboration Suite include Good Share (for SharePoint-based file sharing) and Good Connect (for Lync and Sametime instant messaging). Good's product offerings also include: Good Vault, offering enhanced data protection for Good for Enterprise, and using two-factor authentication; Good for OEMs/Carriers, which enables telecommunications companies to create integrated social messaging experiences for their customers; Good Secure Mobility Solution, which supports developing, securing, deploying, and managing workflows for mobile workers.

== Industry status ==
Good Technology's reports and executives have been cited as experts in the adoption and use of mobile technology in the enterprise sector. In particular, its quarterly Mobility Index Report tracks data based on Good's customers device activations and, more recently, app activations.

Good's client base includes those with high security needs, such as government agencies and financial institutions. Good's security products offer customers a way to migrate from the BlackBerry platform to iOS, Windows Phone and Android. In fall 2013, Good opened offices in Benelux and Stockholm. It also has offices in New Jersey, New York, Washington, Texas, Australia, China, Germany, Italy, South Korea, Spain, and the United Kingdom.

The platform has earned accreditations and certifications that enable companies to comply with government regulations around the world. Good software was required in the U.S. Department of Defense's first approval of Android devices in 2012. In 2013, the platform became the first cross-platform mobile collaboration solution to achieve Common Criteria Evaluation Assurance Level 4 Augmented (EAL4+) and the only containerized solution to meet this level of security certification on either iOS or Android. It was also listed on Australia's Defence Signals Directorate's Evaluated Products List.

A fall 2013 Info Security magazine feature article on women in the information security industry which quoted Good CEO Christy Wyatt, and noted that Good's workforce was 27% female, and its executive team 40% female, both ahead of an estimated 10% female workforce in the industry.
