= Mobile application management =

Management of mobile app in business

Mobile application management (MAM) describes the software and services responsible for provisioning and controlling access to internally developed and commercially available mobile apps used in business settings, on both company-provided and 'bring your own' mobile operating systems as used on smartphones and tablet computers.

Mobile application management provides granular controls at the application level which enable system administrators to manage and secure application or 'app' data. MAM differs from mobile device management (MDM), which focuses on controlling the entire device, and requires that users enroll or register their device, and install a service agent.

While some enterprise mobility management (EMM) suites include a MAM function, their capabilities may be limited in comparison to stand-alone MAM solutions, because EMM suites require a device management profile in order to enable app management capabilities.

== History ==
Enterprise mobile application management has been driven by the widespread adoption and use of mobile applications in business settings. In 2010, the International Data Corporation (IDC) reported that smartphone use in the workplace would double between 2009 and 2014.

The 'bring your own device' (BYOD) phenomenon was a factor behind mobile application management, with personal PC, smartphone, and tablet use in business settings, vs. business-owned devices, rising from 31 per cent in 2010 to 41 per cent in 2011. When an employee brings a personal device into an enterprise setting, mobile application management enables the corporate information technology (IT) staff to download required applications, control access to business data, and remove locally cached business data from the device if it is lost or stolen, or when its owner no longer works with the company.

Use of mobile devices in the workplace is also being driven from above. According to Forrester Research, businesses saw in 2011 mobile as an opportunity to drive innovation across a wide range of business processes. Forrester issued a forecast in August 2011 predicting that the "mobile management services market" would reach $6.6 billion by 2015 – a 69 per cent increase over a previous forecast issued six months earlier.

Citing the plethora of mobile devices in the enterprise – and a growing demand for mobile apps from employees, line-of-business decision-makers, and customers – the report states that organizations were broadening their "mobility strategy" beyond mobile device management to "managing a growing number of mobile applications". Mobile application management has started using machine learning and behavior tracking to improve app security and enforce company policies, especially for personal devices used in the workplace (BYOD).

== App wrapping ==
Application (or app) wrapping was a favoured method of applying policy to applications as part of mobile application management solutions.

Normally, application wrapping is performed using a software development kit (SDK) from an application or EMM seller that permits an engineer or administrator to convey an application programming interface (API) that empowers board arrangements to be set up. For instance, an application-wrapping API would allow an administrator to control who is allowed to download an application and whether corporate information accessed through the application could be copied or shared. Application wrapping can be applied during internal software development or sometimes later to commercially accessed apps by inserting additional executable codes through the SDK.

One commonly used application platform, Microsoft's Office 365, presents a set of challenges to its management. Previously, Office 365 did not support application management through third-party EMMs, unless it was through its InTune cloud-based administration service.

Increasingly, the likes of Apple and Samsung are overcoming the issue of app wrapping. Aside from the fact that app wrapping is a legal grey zone, and may not meet its actual aims, it is not possible to adapt the entire operating system to deal with numerous wrapped apps. In general, wrapped apps available in the app stores have also not proven to be successful due to their inability to perform without MDM.

== System features ==
An end-to-end mobile application management solution provides the ability to: control the provisioning, updating, and removal of mobile applications via an enterprise app store, monitor application performance and usage, and remotely wipe data from managed applications. Core features of mobile application management systems include:

- App configuration
- App delivery (Enterprise App Store)
- App performance monitoring
- App updating
- App version management
- App wrapping
- Crash log reporting
- Event management
- Push services
- Reporting and tracking
- Usage analytics
- User & group access control
- User authentication

== See also ==
- Over-the-air programming
- Mobile security
- List of Mobile Device Management software
