= Microsoft Intune =

Cloud based computer software

- Developer: Microsoft

Stable release(s) [±]
- Windows: 11.2.1952 / August 5, 2026; 1 day ago
- iOS: 5.2606 / July 8, 2026; 29 days ago
- Android: 5.0.6826 / December 14, 2025; 7 months ago
- Operating system: Windows 10, 11; iOS 17+; Android 8+; Discontinued: iOS 16 (2026); iOS 14, 15 (2025); Android 6, 7 (2022); Android 5 (2021); Android KitKat (2019); Android Ice Cream Sandwich, Jelly Bean (2017)
- Platform: Cross-platform
- Type: Endpoint management cloud-based service
- Website: Official site

Microsoft Intune (formerly Microsoft Endpoint Manager and Windows Intune) is a Microsoft cloud-based unified endpoint management service for both corporate and BYOD devices. It extends some of the "on-premises" functionality of Microsoft Configuration Manager to the Microsoft Azure cloud.

== History ==
Microsoft Intune was originally introduced as Windows Intune in April 2010. Microsoft then extended the service to other platforms and renamed it to Microsoft Intune in 2014.

== Distribution ==
Intune management is accomplished using a web-based portal. Distribution is through a subscription system from Azure. Usage is done with a fixed monthly cost per user. It also works with Endpoint Manager in co management with Microsoft Configuration Manager (hybrid mode).

It is included in Microsoft Enterprise Mobility + Security (EMS) suite and Microsoft Office 365 Enterprise E5, which were both succeeded by Microsoft 365 in July 2017. Microsoft 365 Business Premium licenses also include Intune and EMS.

Microsoft Intune is a cloud-based endpoint management solution. It manages user access and simplifies app and device management across many devices, including mobile devices, desktop computers, and virtual endpoints. As organizations move to support hybrid and remote workforces, they face the challenge of managing devices to access organizational resources. Staff and students must collaborate, work across the board, and access and participate in these resources safely. Managers must protect organizational data, manage end-user access, and support users wherever they work.

== Function ==
Intune supports Android, ChromeOS, iOS, Linux, macOS, and Windows operating systems. Administration is done via a web browser. The administration console allows Intune to invoke remote tasks such as malware scans. Since version 2.0, installation of software packages in .exe, .msi and .msp format are supported. Installations are encrypted and compressed on Microsoft Azure Storage. Software installation can begin upon login. It can record and administer volume, retail and OEM licenses, and licenses which are administered by third parties. Upgrades to newer versions of the Intune software are also controlled.

Information about inventory is recorded automatically. Managed computers can be grouped together when problems occur. Intune notifies support staff as well as notifying an external dealer via e-mail.

== Intune plans ==
Since March 2023 Microsoft Intune is available in 3 versions: Intune Plan 1, Intune Plan 2 and Intune Suite. Plan 2 or Suite do not include Plan 1. Microsoft Intune P1 is included with subscriptions to Microsoft 365 E3, E5, F1, F3, Enterprise Mobility + Security E3 and E5, and Business Premium plans.

== Reception ==
Der Standard praised the application, saying: "The cloud service Intune promises to be a simple PC Management tool via Web console. The interface provides a quick overview of the system of state enterprise." German PC World positively evaluated "usability" saying that it "kept the interface simple". Business Computing World criticized the program, saying "Although Windows Intune worked well in our tests and did everything expected of it, we didn't find it all that easy to get to grips with", blaming the unintuitive "deceptively simple" management interface. ITespresso rated it "good", but noted connection issues with the remote assistance feature and that changes to firewall settings could take upwards of a full day to push out to clients.
