= Revel Systems =

IPad-based point of sale system

- Founded: 2010; 16 years ago
- Founders: Lisa Falzone; Chris Ciabarra
- Headquarters: Atlanta, United States
- Key people: Greg Dukat (CEO); Chris Lybeer (CSO); Leslie Leaf (CCO); Art Beckman (CIO); Tracy Caswell; (General Counsel)
- Products: Quick Service POS, Restaurant POS, Retail POS, Coffee Shop POS, Pizza Restaurant POS, Events POS, Mobile POS, Grocery POS
- Owner: Shift4 (2024-present); WCAS (2017-24)
- Website: revelsystems.com

Revel Systems is an iPad-based point of sale system co-founded by Lisa Falzone and Christopher Ciabarra. In June 2024, it was announced that the company was acquired by Shift4.

== History ==
Revel Systems was founded in 2010 in San Francisco. In May 2011, Revel received $3.7 million in funding from DCM. In 2015 the company announced an investment of approximately $13.5 Million from ROTH Capital Partners, bringing Revel's Series C round to approximately $110 Million. This infusion from ROTH was Revel's C-3 investment round, a follow-up to the Series C-1 round led by Welsh, Carson, Anderson & Stowe (WCAS) in November 2014 and Series C-2 round led by Intuit Inc. in December 2014. The two founders Lisa Falzone and Chris Ciabarra took Revel to a 500 million dollar evaluation before exiting.

In 2015, the company announced a strategic partnership with Apple Computers as a member of the Apple Enterprise Mobility Program and in 2014 Revel announced a partnership with Intuit to create Quickbooks Point of Sale Powered by Revel Systems and in Sept 2016 Revel announced a partnership with Shell Global

The company integrates with third-party vendors, and has an open API, allowing others to customize the POS system. Revel released Atlas V2 for the iPad POS in February 2012.

The Revel Systems headquarters is located in Atlanta, Georgia. Additional offices are located in San Francisco, California and Vilnius, Lithuania. European sales are handled by office in London. Revel's iPad point of sale software focuses on security in order to be a properly licensed system. Revel was the first iPad POS to implement EMV—or "Chip and Pin"—Processing in the United States, in January 2013.

Some of Revel's clients include the following (or franchisees of the following): Shell, Smoothie King, Tully's Coffee, Little Caesars Pizza, Legends Hospitality, Rocky Mountain Chocolate Factory, Popeyes Louisiana Kitchen, Illy Coffee, Dairy Queen, Forever Yogurt, and Twistee Treat, among others. Revel has partnered with retail giants Belkin and Goodwill.

In February 2017 it was announced that Falzone had been replaced as CEO after taking the company to half a billion dollars in evaluation. Lisa Falzone and CTO Chris Ciabarra were removed by majority share holder, investment firm Welsh, Carson, Anderson & Stowe (WCAS), which now has a majority stake in the company. New CEO Greg Dukat was appointed. Revel was controlled by WCAS until June 2024, when the company was acquired by Shift4.

== POS systems ==
Revel Systems' Point of sale system operates on the Apple iPad. The backend can be managed via mobile device or via Web browser. Associated hardware includes: receipt printer, cash drawer, and card swipe. Revel also announced the Revel Ethernet Connect cable in 2015 that allows for a hardwired Ethernet connection to iPads running Revel software.

Revel has several POS systems for the culinary industry such as Kitchen Display System, Drive-through POS, Food Truck POS, and Restaurant POS. Other retail POS systems include Grocery POS, Retail POS, and Quick Service POS. Revel also have systems for large venues including Stadium POS and Events POS.

Revel Systems offers a range of preconfigured hardware to complement its point of sale system. The Apple iPad acts as a business's main POS terminal, or register. Transactions, orders, and various other functions take place on the iPad POS. The iPad Mini is used as a POS terminal for customer-facing kiosks and table-side ordering. The Apple iPod Touch serves as a line-buster, or as a customer-facing display. These terminals work with Epson Printers, wireless routers, access points, cash drawers, card swipes, and barcode scanners to meet a merchant's needs.

Revel allows for a customizable point of sale solution and integrates with a variety of third party providers. Providers for payment include FirstData, Mercury Payments, LevelUp, Adyen and PayPal. Reporting is provided by companies including Avero, CTUIT, and RTI Connect. Revel's gift card providers include Givex, Mercury, PlasticPrinters, Synergy, and Valutec. The loyalty and reward program is provided by companies including LevelUp, Punchh, LoyalTree, and Synergy. Revel systems include Facebook and Twitter integration with online ordering options provided by companies including Zuppler, and Shopify. Revel's Managed Hosting is provided by Singlehop and Softlayer.

== Recognition ==
Revel Systems was included first on the list of Business News Daily's "Best iPad POS Systems." In 2013, Revel Systems was chosen as the Best Retail app in the Business at the Tabby Awards and CEO Lisa Falzone was recognized in Tech Cocktail as one of "15 Female Entrepreneurs You Should Know About (But Probably Don't)." In 2015 Lisa Falzone was named on the Fortune 40 Under 40 list and the Forbes list of Eight Rising Stars.

== See also ==
- Point of sale companies category
- Point of Sale Malware
