= Interactive kiosk =

Public computer terminal

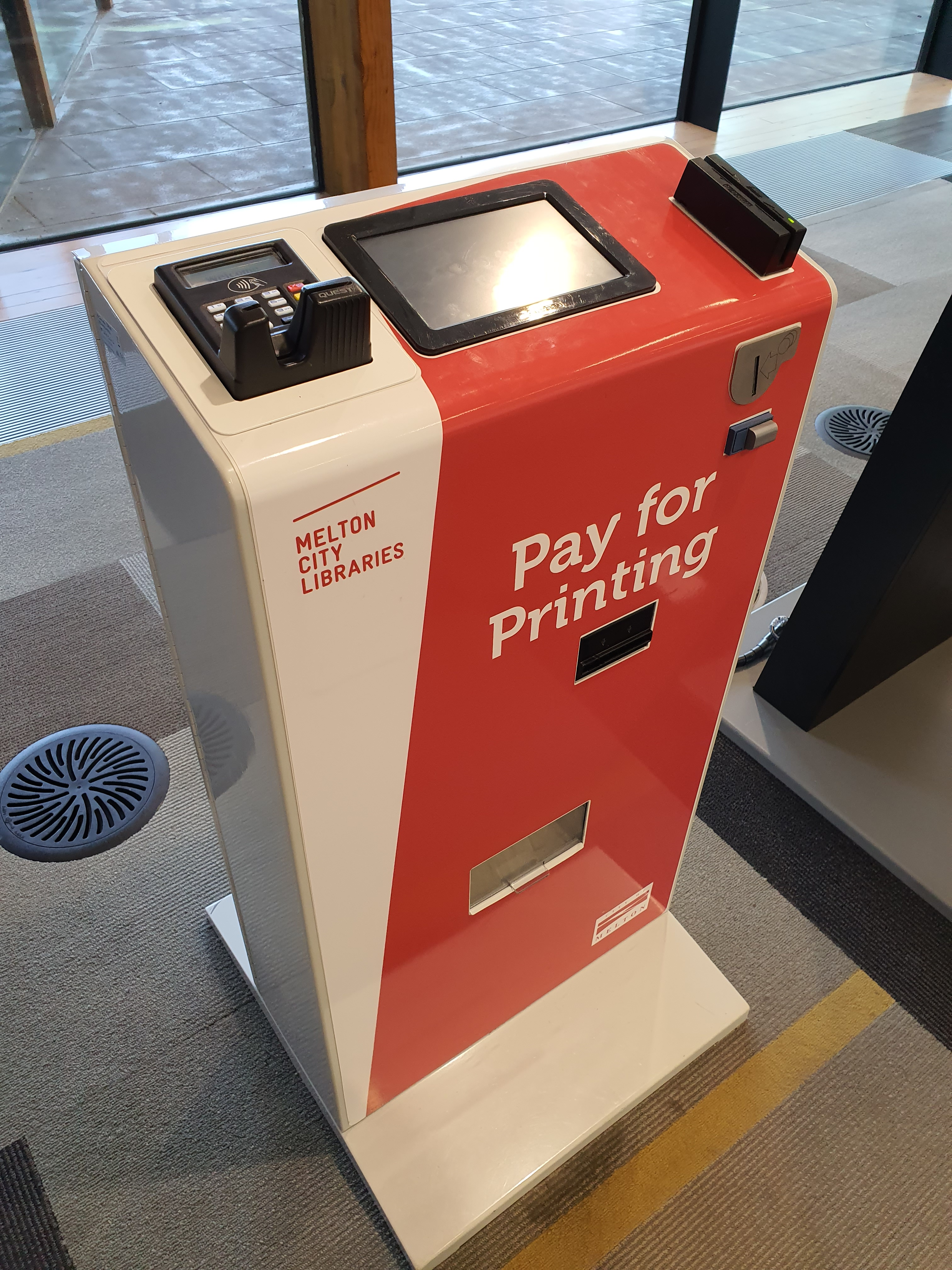
Payment kiosk

An interactive kiosk is a computer terminal featuring specialized hardware and software that provides access to information and applications for communication, commerce, entertainment, or education.

By 2010, the largest bill pay kiosk network was AT&T, which allowed for phone customers to pay their bills. Verizon and Sprint have also introduced similar units over time.

Early interactive kiosks sometimes resembled telephone booths, but have been embraced by retail, food service, and hospitality to improve customer service and streamline operations. Interactive kiosks are typically placed in the high foot traffic settings such as shops, hotel lobbies, or airports.

The integration of technology allows kiosks to perform a wide range of functions, evolving into self-service kiosks. For example, kiosks may enable users to order from a shop's catalog when items are not in stock, check out a library book, look up information about products, issue a hotel key card, enter a public utility bill account number to perform an online transaction, or collect cash in exchange for merchandise. Customized components such as coin hoppers, bill acceptors, card readers, and thermal printers enable kiosks to meet the owner's specialized needs.

== History ==
The first self-service, interactive kiosk was developed in 1977 at the University of Illinois at Urbana–Champaign by a pre-med student, Murray Lappe. The content was created on the PLATO computer system and accessible by the plasma touch-screen interface. The plasma display panel was invented at the University of Illinois by Donald L. Bitzer. Lappe's kiosk, called The Plato Hotline allowed students and visitors to find movies, maps, directories, bus schedules, extracurricular activities, and courses.

The first successful network of interactive kiosks used for commercial purposes was a project developed by the shoe retailer Florsheim Shoe Co., led by their executive VP, Harry Bock, installed circa 1985. The interactive kiosk was created, manufactured, and customized by ByVideo Inc. of Sunnyvale, California. The network of over 600 kiosks provided images and video promotion for customers who wished to purchase shoes that were not available in the retail location. Style, size, and color could be selected, and the product paid for on the kiosk itself. The transaction was sent to the Florsheim mainframe in St, Louis, MO, via dialup lines, for next-day home or store delivery via Federal Express. The hardware (including a microcomputer, display system, touchscreen) was designed and built by ByVideo, while other components (like the CRT, floppy disk, printer, keyboard, and physical housing) were sourced from other vendors. The videodisc material was created quarterly by ByVideo at Florsheim's direction, in ByVideo's state-of-the-art video production facility in California. This kiosk network operated for over 6 years in Florsheim retail locations.

In 1991, the first commercial kiosk with an Internet connection was displayed at Comdex. The application was for locating missing children. The first true documentation of a kiosk was the 1995 report by Los Alamos National Laboratory which detailed what the interactive kiosk consisted of. This was first announced on comp.infosystems.kiosks by Arthur, the original Usenet moderator.

In 1997, KioskCom was launched to provide a tradeshow for organizations looking to deploy interactive self-service kiosks. These trade shows used to occur twice a year, and offer companies education and demonstrations for successful self-service deployments.

The first company to launch a statewide interactive kiosk program was Imperial Multimedia in 2007. Imperial Multimedia installed interactive kiosks in 31 of Virginia's State Parks and these electronic kiosks included park overviews, printable maps, waypoints, points of interest, video tours of trails, and emergency information.

Today's kiosks are usually found in the airport at departure and also baggage, QSR, and fast casual self-order deployments have greatly expanded. There are now restaurants that orders only come in via mobile or kiosks. With the COVID-19 outbreak, new kiosk iterations such as the temperature screening kiosk have seen exponential growth in a very short time. Bill payment kiosks for AT&T and Verizon are expanding as well.

== Design and construction ==
The aesthetic and functional design of interactive kiosks is a key element that drives user adoption, overall up-time, and affordability. There are many factors to consider when designing an interactive kiosk including:

- Aesthetic design: The design of the enclosure is often the driving factor in user adoption and brand recognition.
- Manufacturing volume: This will determine which manufacturing processes are appropriate to use (i.e. sheet-metal, thermoformed plastic, etc.).
- Kiosk software: The interactive function of the kiosk hardware is largely determined by the software program and kiosk software configuration.
- Graphic messaging: Plays a key role in communicating with potential users.
- Maintenance and thermal design: Critical to maximizing up-time (the time between failures or crashes).
- Component specification: Typical components include touchscreen, P.C., pointing device, keyboard, bill acceptor, mag-stripe and/ or bar-code scanner, surge protector, UPS, etc.
- Ergonomic: Is important to ensure comfortable and easy user accessibility.
- Regulatory compliance: In the US it is important to design to the Americans with Disabilities Act (ADA). Electrical standards include UL in the U.S. and CE in Europe. In the retail space, Payment Card Industry (PCI) certification exists in the U.S. which is a descendant of VISA PED (relative of Chip and PIN in Europe).
- Interface design: Designing for interactive kiosks typically requires larger buttons and simpler decision trees than designing for a web or computer-based interactive. Catchy attractive animations and short dwell times are important.
- Durability: The intended location of the kiosk will largely influence the construction as materials and electronic requirements are significantly different for indoor vs. outdoor kiosks.Touchscreen kiosks can have accessibility barriers when without other ways to receive information or operate controls. Interfaces without physical keypads or other tactile controls can be unusable for many people who are blind or have low vision unless information is also spoken audibly. Conversely, audio information without captions or text equivalents can exclude users who are deaf or hard of hearing. Positioning of controls and displays also affects access for wheelchair users and people of short stature.

== Interactive kiosks around the world ==
=== Government usage ===
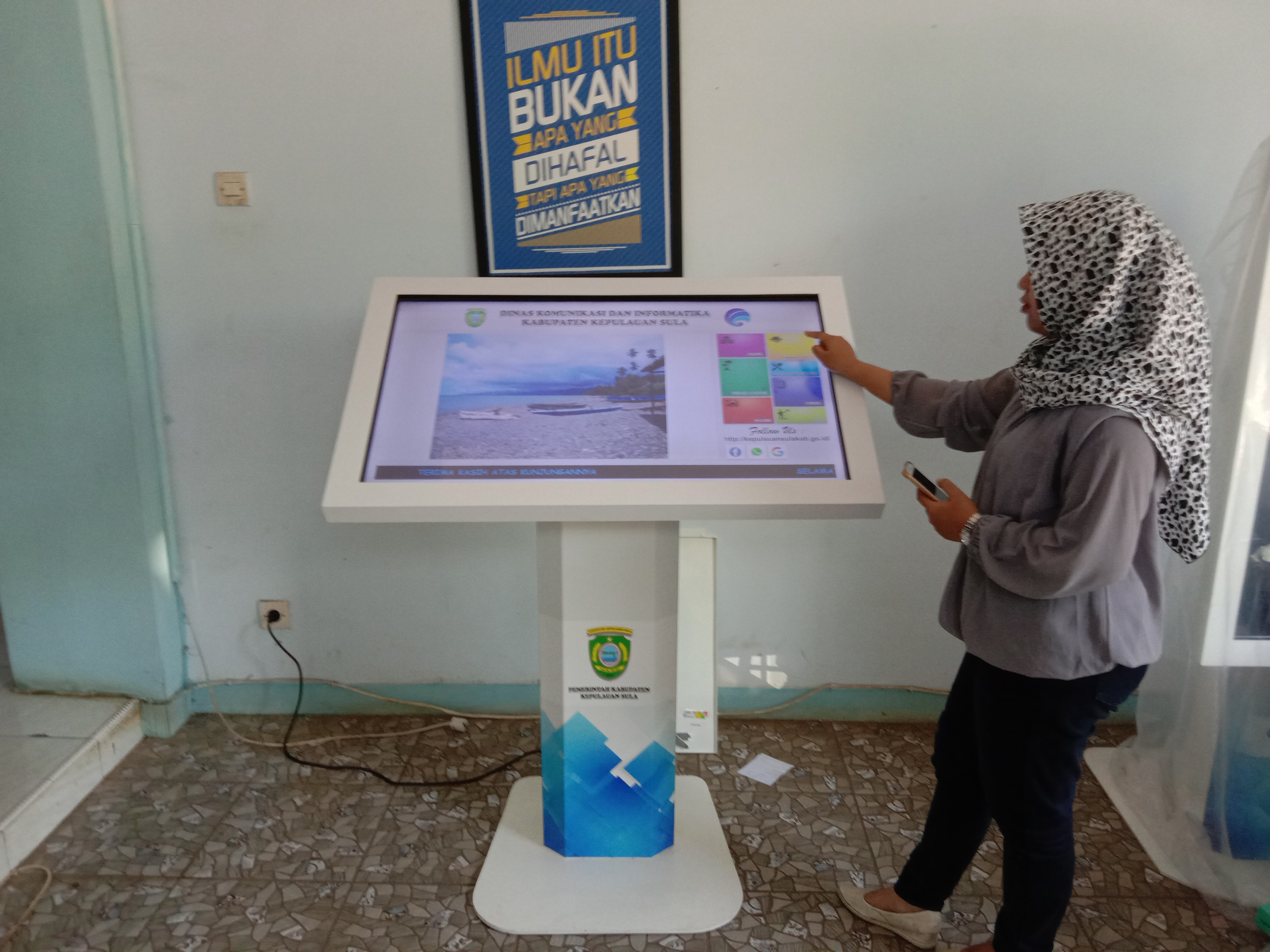
Cyosce Interactive Kiosk of the Sula Islands Regency government, Indonesia

Several countries historically implemented the nationwide installation of kiosks for various purposes. One example of such large scale installations can be found in the United Kingdom, where thousands of special-purpose kiosks are now available to aid job-seekers in finding employment.

The United States Department of Homeland Security has created immigration kiosks where visitors register when they enter the United States. There are also exit kiosks where visitors register when they leave the U.S.

The postal service has automated kiosks in many of the postal offices for self-service.

The Veterans Administration has over 5,000 patient kiosks deployed. In 2020 the next generation kiosks along with mobile check-in for veterans began.

In India, digital kiosks are used for various purposes, such as payment of bills.

=== Industry usage ===
It is estimated that over 1,200,000 kiosk terminals exist in the U.S. and Canada alone.

Groups who use kiosks in their business environment include: Delta Air Lines, United Airlines, JetBlue Airways, GTAA, Future Shop, The Home Depot, Target Corporation, and Wal-Mart.

== Types of kiosks ==
=== Telekiosk ===
The telekiosk can be considered the technical successor to the telephone booth, a publicly accessible set of devices that are used for communication. These can include email, fax, SMS, as well as standard telephone service. The telekiosk is rarely seen any more.

Telekiosks gradually appeared around the United Kingdom in the first years of the 21st century. Some are situated in shopping centers and transport terminals, to provide detailed local information. Others are in public places, including motorway service areas and airports.

The International Telecommunication Union is promoting the use of the telekiosk in Africa and parts of Asia where local people do not have access to communications technology. In part, this work addresses the "digital divide" between rich and poor nations. There are, however, great practical benefits. The scheme in Bhutan aims to provide an E-Post system, whereby messages are relayed by telephone, then delivered by hand to rural areas, easing the problems of transporting letters across the countryside. Health, agricultural and educational information is also available.

=== Financial services kiosk ===
The financial services kiosk can provide the ability for customers to perform transactions that may normally require a bank teller and maybe more complex and longer to perform than desired at an ATM. These are sometimes referred to as "bank-in-a-box" and the first prime example would be the Vcom units deployed at 7-Eleven in the U.S.

These units are generally referred to as 'multi-function financial service kiosks' and the first iteration was back in the late 1990s with the VCOM product deployed in Southland (7-Eleven) convenience stores. Check-cashing, bill-payment and even dispensing cash cards. New multi-function machines have been deployed in "c-store" markets supported by Speedway and others.

=== Photo kiosk ===
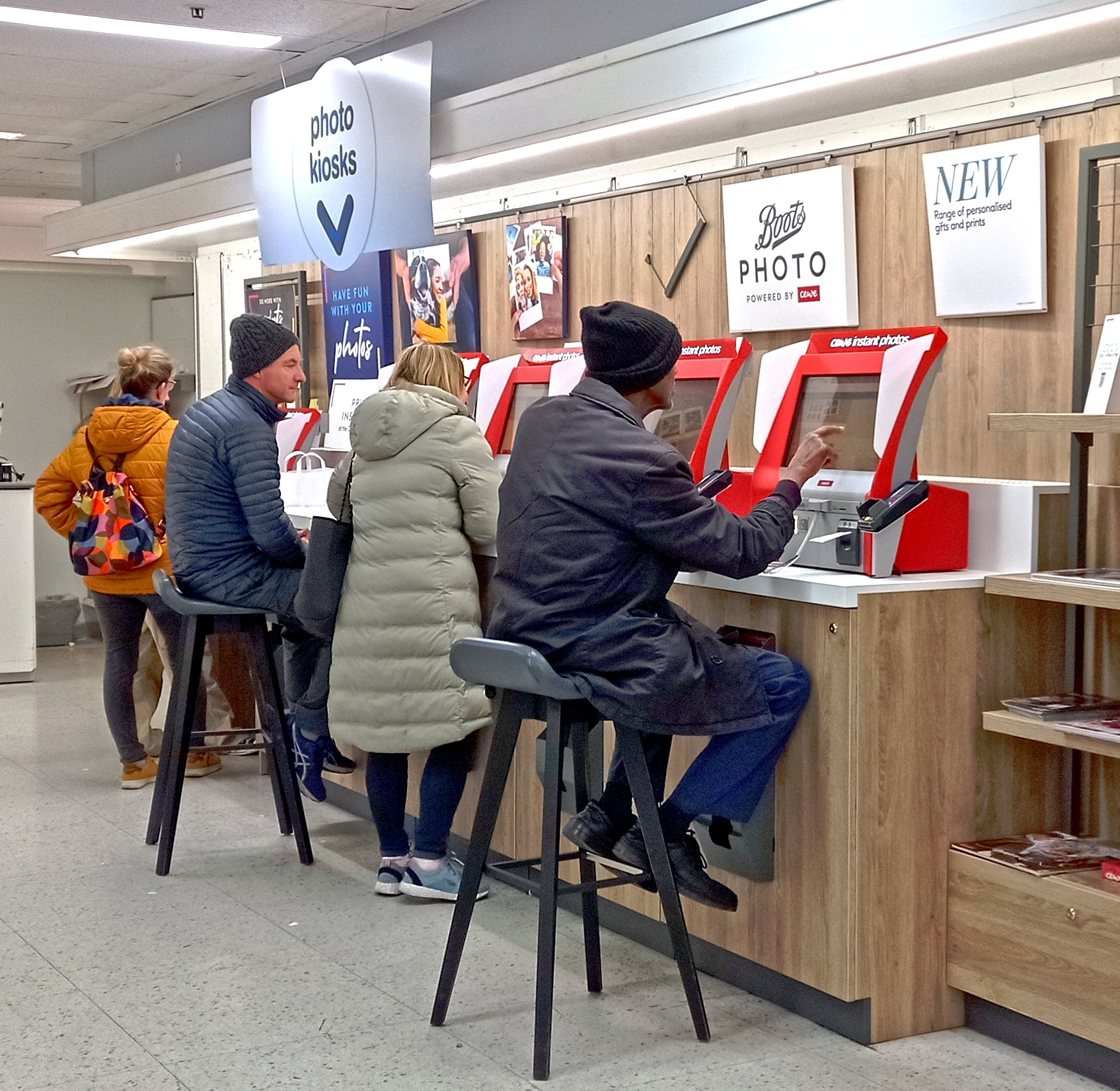
Self-service photo kiosks in London, England

An interactive kiosk allows users to print pictures from their digital images. The marquee example began with Kodak who had at one point had over 100,000 units up and running in the U.S. Many of these units were customized PCs with an LCD which would then print to the central printer in Customer service. Two major classes of photo kiosks exist:

Digital order stations is a type of photo kiosk exists within retail locations and allows users to place orders for prints and photographic products. Products typically get produced in-store by a digital minilab, or at another location to be shipped directly to the consumer, or back to the store to be picked up at a later time. Digital Order Stations may or may not support instant printing, and typically do not handle payments.

Instant print stations is a type of photo kiosk uses internal printers to instantly create photographic prints for a self serve paying customer. Often located in public locations (hotels, schools, airports), Instant Print Stations handle payments. Often such systems will only print 4x6 inch prints, although popular dye-sublimation photo printers as of 2008 allow for 4x6, 5x7, 8x10, 8x12. It is more a matter of resupply labor economics and chassis size.

=== Internet kiosk ===
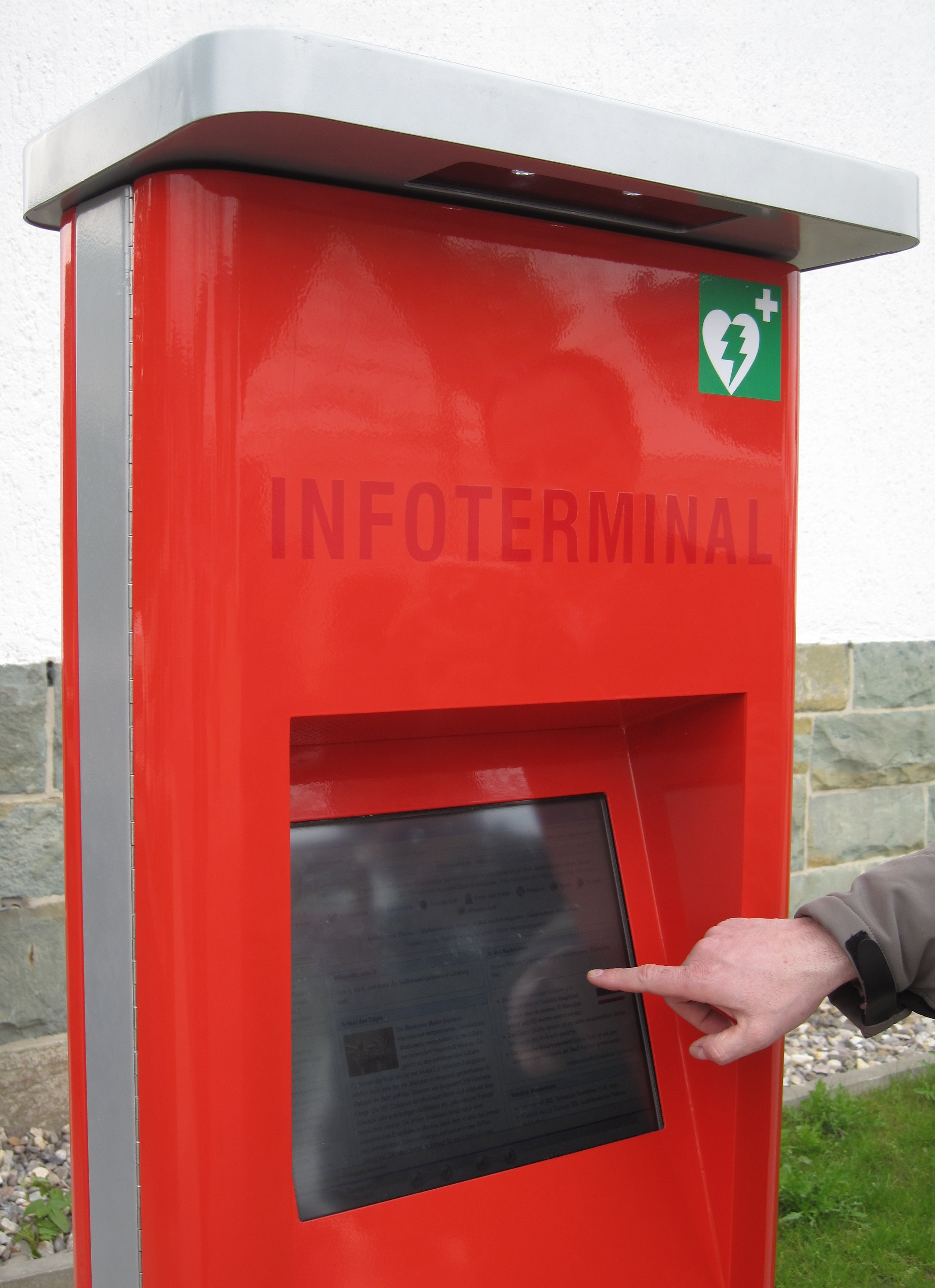
An Internet kiosk in Hemer, Germany, showcasing main page of the German Wikipedia

An Internet kiosk is a terminal that provides public Internet access. Internet kiosks sometimes resemble telephone booths, and are typically placed in settings such as hotel lobbies, long-term care facilities, medical waiting rooms, apartment complex offices, or airports for fast access to e-mail or web pages. Internet kiosks sometimes have a bill acceptor or a credit card swipe, and nearly always have a computer keyboard, a mouse (or a fixed trackball which is more robust), and a monitor.

Some Internet kiosks are based on a payment model similar to vending machines or Internet cafés, while others are free. A common arrangement with pay-for-use kiosks has the owner of the Internet kiosk enter into a partnership with the owner of its location, paying either a flat rate for rental of the floor space or a percentage of the monthly revenue generated by the machine.

One of the first companies in North America to develop and deploy Internet kiosks with touch screens via user login and password was Streetspace Inc. based out of San Francisco, California. Starting in 1999 they deployed Internet kiosks across locations inside cafes, restaurants, and record shops in Berkeley, California. Streetspace was also one of the first companies to roll out targeted advertising and services to these Internet kiosks based on the location of the kiosk and the profile of the user when they logged into the terminal.

Internet kiosks have been the subject of hacker activity. Hackers will download spyware and catch user activity via keystroke logging. Other hackers have installed hardware keystroke logging devices that capture user activity.

Businesses that provide Internet kiosks are encouraged to use special Internet kiosk software and management procedures to reduce liability exposure.

=== Ticketing kiosk ===
Many amusement parks such as Disney have unattended outdoor ticketing kiosks. Amtrak has automated self-service ticketing kiosks. Busch Gardens uses kiosks for amusement parks. Lisbon Oceanarium has self-service ticketing kiosks by Partteam & Oemkiosks. Cruise ships use ticketing kiosks for passengers. Check-in kiosks for auto rental companies such as Alamo and National have had national deployments. The ticket halls of train stations and metro stations have ticketing kiosks that sell transit passes, train tickets, transit tickets, and train passes.

=== Movie ticket kiosk ===
Many movie theater chains have specialized ticket machines that allow their customers to purchase tickets and/or pick up tickets that were purchased online. Radiant and Fujitsu have been involved in this segment.

=== Restaurant kiosk ===
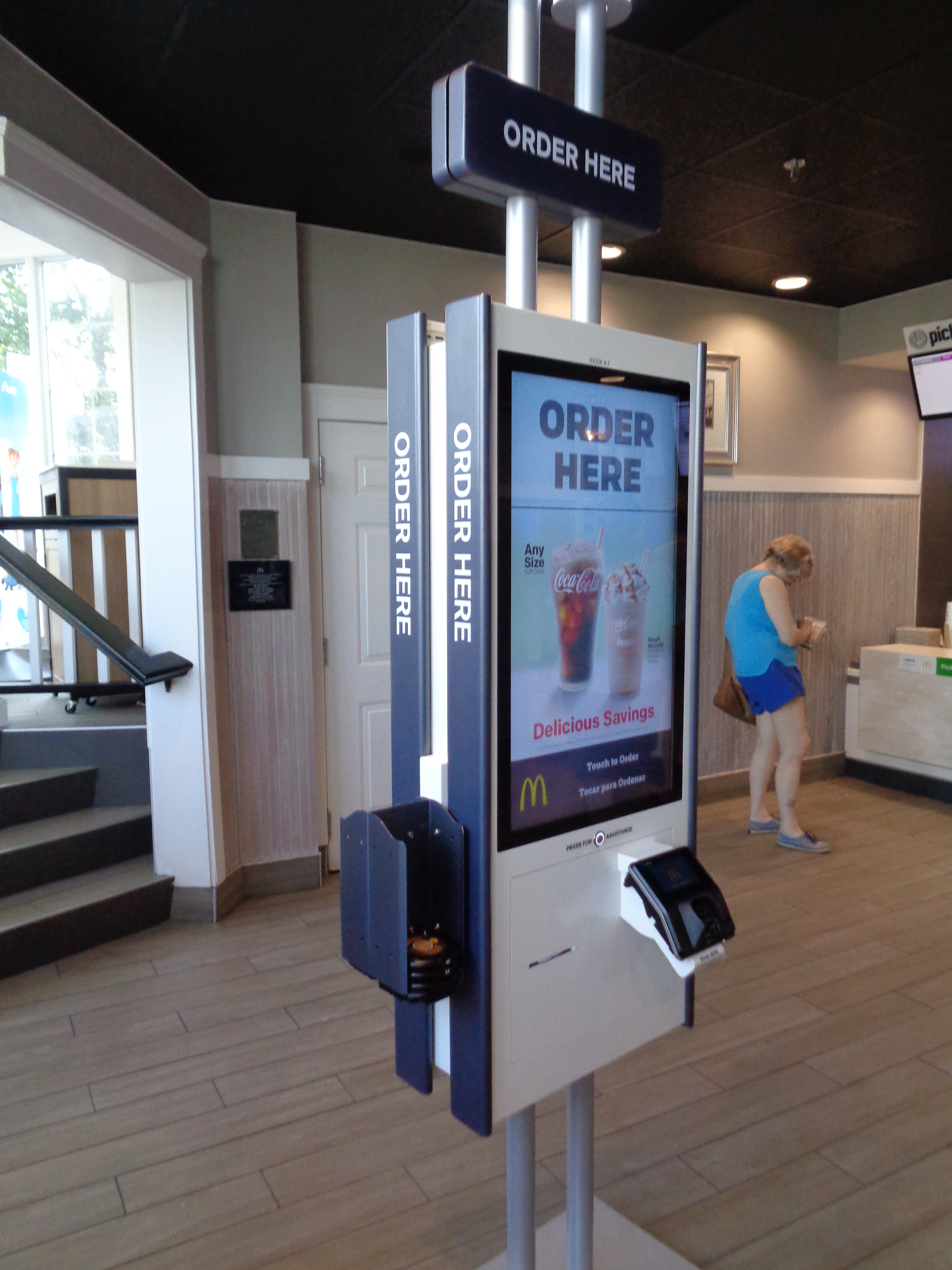
A McDonald's self-service kiosk in Nassau County, New York, US

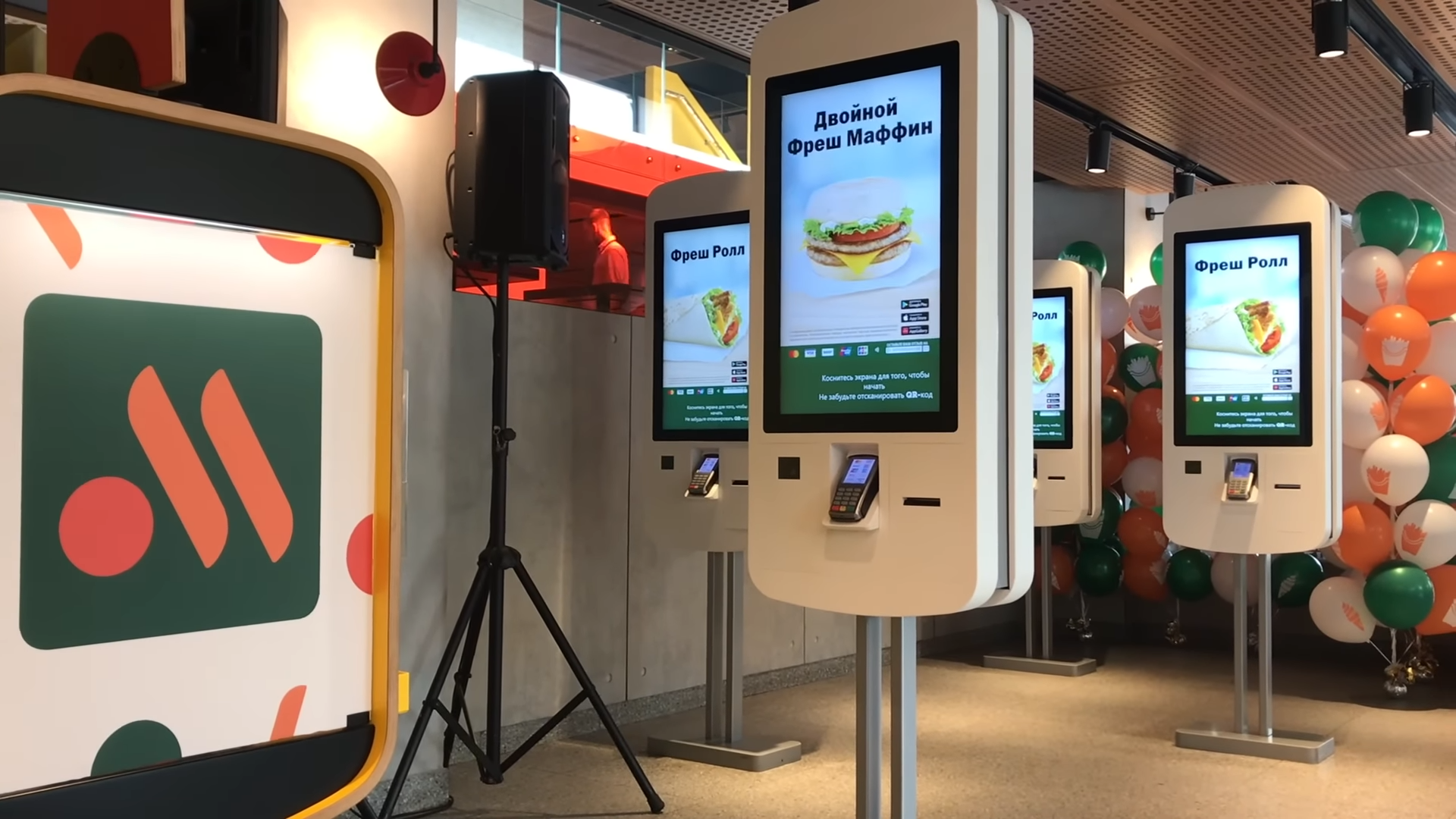
Self-service kiosks of Vkusno i Tochka, Russia

A new way to order in-cafe from tablet kiosks. Kiosks are available in addition to cashier stations so that wait time is reduced for all guests. The kiosk is highly visual and includes a product builder to assist with order accuracy and customization.

=== DVD vending kiosk ===
An example of a vending kiosk is that of the DVD rental kiosks, where a user can rent a DVD, secured by credit card. One of the largest was Redbox with a presence throughout North America.

=== Visitor management and security kiosk ===
Visitor management and security kiosk can facilitate the visitor check-in process at businesses, schools, and other controlled access environments. These systems can check against blacklists, run criminal background checks, and print access badges for visitors. School security concerns in the United States have led to an increase in these types of kiosks to screen and track visitors.

=== Building directory and wayfinding kiosk ===
Many shopping malls, hospitals, airports and other large public buildings use interactive kiosks to allow visitors to navigate in buildings. Harris County Hospital District, Baptist Hospital of Miami, the Children's Hospital of Philadelphia and the Cayuga Medical Center are but a few medical centers utilizing interactive touch screen kiosks with a building directory and wayfinding solution.

=== Hospital and medical clinic registration and check-in kiosks ===
Hospitals and medical clinics are looking to kiosks to allow patients to perform routine activities. Kiosks that allow patients to check-in for their scheduled appointments and update their demographics to reduce the need to line up and interact with a registration clerk. In areas where patients must make a co-pay, kiosks will also collect payment. As the requirements for documentation, waivers, and consent increase, kiosks with integrated signature capture devices can present the documentation to the patient and collect their signature. A business case for registration and check-in kiosks is built around:

1. workload reduction,
2. data quality improvements,
3. consistency of the registration process, and
4. patient experience improvement.

A large community hospital has been able to reduce their registration staff by 30%, improve data quality, and shorten lineups.

Kiosks can display information customized to the user such as personalized messages helping them to manage their health.

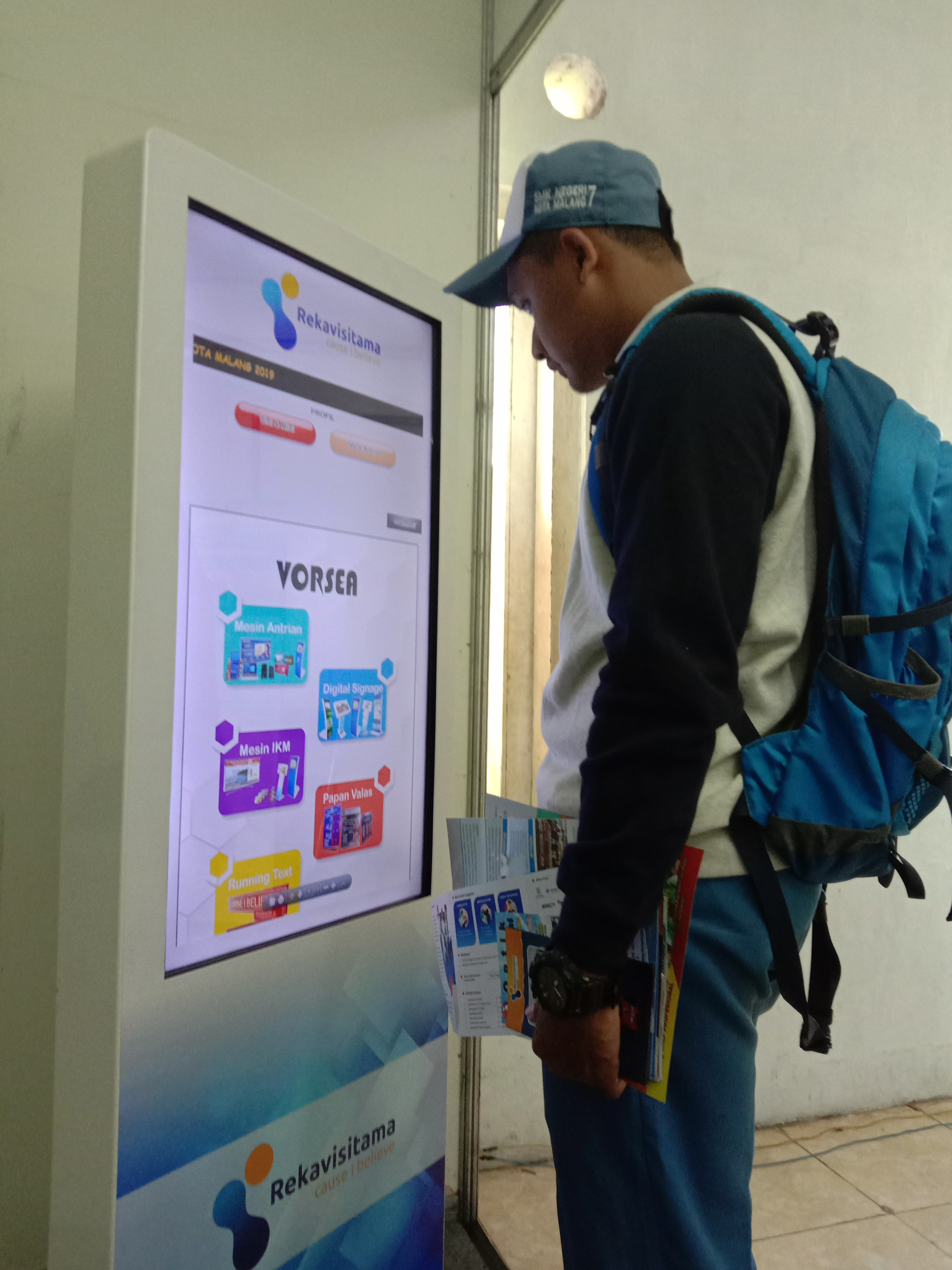
Information kiosk in a job fair, Malang, Indonesia

=== Information kiosk ===
Museums, historical sites, national parks, and other tourists/visitor attractions often engage kiosks as a method for conveying information about a particular exhibit or site. Kiosks allow guests to read about - or view the video of - particular artifacts or areas at their own pace and in an interactive manner.

The Rockwell Museum in New York City uses touchscreen tablets to provide visitors with accessible and relevant labels for a particular exhibit. The Penn State All sports museum employs interactive kiosks to display up to date information about past and current Penn State athletes and sports teams. The Ellis Island National Museum of Immigration has a citizen test available for visitors to take online via an informational kiosk.

=== Video kiosk ===
Video kiosk integrates video conferencing and collaboration capabilities to help users run video calls or conferences with available operators, view content or exchange messages. Video kiosks are often used in banking or telemedicine for improved customer service.

== Kiosk reliability ==
Reliability is an important consideration, and as a result, many specialized kiosk software applications have been developed for the industry. These applications interface with the bill acceptor and credit card swipe, meter time, prevent users from changing the configuration of software or downloading computer viruses and allow the kiosk owner to see revenue. Threats to reliability come from vulnerabilities to hacking, allowing access to the OS, and the need for a session or hardware restart.

== Kiosk industry segments ==
The kiosk industry is divided into four segments: kiosk enclosures, kiosk software (application and remote monitoring), components, service, and installation. Kiosk software provides the application for the users. A patient check-in or bill payment application are good templates. The software can also lock down the operating system (be it Apple, Windows, Android, or Linux or ChromeOS) to restrict access and/or functionality of a kiosk hardware device. USB devices and exposed external ports present security risks for example.

=== Temperature kiosks ===
Temperature kiosks began with the COVID-19 outbreak. They typically require no interaction except for the user to approach the terminal. A thermal imaging camera or a thermopile temperature sensor is typically used in conjunction with a camera to measure surface temperature (usually the forehead). Thermal imaging systems can drill down to the inner canthus which yields a more representative temperature. As of August 2020, temperature kiosks are still relatively unregulated by the FDA.

=== Smart City kiosks ===
The project in New York City lays out smart city kiosks. They are typically outdoor, larger than 42", and often two-sided. The idea is to provide Internet access on the street which means applications like Wayfinding or tie-ins to transportation systems come integrated.

=== Kiosk manufacturing industry ===
Historically, electronic kiosks though are stand-alone enclosures that accept user input, integrate many devices, include a software GUI application, and remote monitoring, and are deployed widely across all industry verticals. This is considered "kiosk hardware" within the kiosk industry.

POS-related "kiosks" are "lane busting" check-outs, such as seen at large retailers, like Home Depot and Kroger.

Simple touchscreen terminals or panel-pcs are another segment and enjoy most of their footprint in POS retail applications and typically facing the employee. Terminals include NCR Advantage (740x terminal) and the IBM Anyplace computer terminal. These units are considered "kiosks" only in functionality delivered and typically only incorporate touchscreen, bar code scanner, and/or magnetic stripe reader.

Market segments for kiosks and self-service terminal manufacturers include photo kiosks, government, airlines, internet, music, retail loyalty, HR, and financial services, just to name some.

=== Customer flow, queue and check-in ===
This segment includes healthcare patient check-in and "take a number" type custom flow. Devices range from simple ticket dispense to biometrics (fingerprint readers) for patient check-in.

The basic application of kiosks in the hotel industry is to reduce waiting time for guests at check-in/checkout and relieve the reception desk.Usually, hotel kiosks are located in the lobby and are integrated or interface with the hotel's property management system. The machines allow guests to fill in and sign a registration card, select a room, issue hotel key cards, check for extra offers or upgrades, and book and pay for them. In addition, they self-checkout kiosks can be utilized in micro markets at the hotel, as well. In retail, clients can place online orders in store for home delivery, avoid queuing in fast-food restaurants, and issue library books. Generally, kiosks are seen as an enhancement to a retail or hospitality offer rather than replacing staff members.

== See also ==
- Automated teller machine
- Internet cafe
- Kiosk
- Kiosk software
- Self service
- Vending machine
- Self-checkout
