= Unwired enterprise =

An unwired enterprise is an organization that extends and supports the use of traditional thick client enterprise applications to a variety of mobile devices and their users throughout the organization. The abiding characteristic is seamless universal mobile access to critical applications and business data.

== Use ==
By supporting mobile clients alongside more traditional desktop and laptop clients, an unwired enterprise attempts to increase productivity rates and speed the pace of many common business processes through anytime/anywhere accessibility. Furthermore, it is believed that supporting mobile access to enterprise applications can help facilitate cogent decision making by pulling business data in real time from server systems and making it available to the mobile workforce at the decision point.

Even though the wireless network is quite ubiquitous, this type of client application requires built-in procedures to deal with any network unavailability seamlessly, without interfering with application core functionality. Pervasive broadband, simplified wireless integration and a common management system are technology trends driving more organizations toward an unwired enterprise due to lowering complexity and greater ease of use.

Unwired enterprises may include office environments in which workers are untethered from traditional desktop clients and conduct all business and communication from a wide variety of wireless devices. In the unwired enterprise, client platform and operating system are deemphasized as focus shifts away from platform homogeneity to fluid and expedient data exchange and technology agnosticism. Open standards industry initiatives such as the Open Handset Alliance are designed to help mobile technology vendors deliver on this promise.
