= Unified endpoint management =

Class of software tools

Unified endpoint management (UEM) is a class of software tools that provide a single management interface for mobile, PC and other devices. It is an evolution of, and replacement for, mobile device management (MDM) and enterprise mobility management (EMM) and client management tools.

It provides capabilities for managing and securing mobile applications, content, collaboration and more. It is a single approach to managing all endpoints like smartphones, tablets, laptops, printers, ruggedized devices, Internet of Things (IoT) and wearables.

== Evolution ==
With new types of devices being used in the workplace, administration of traditional laptops, desktops and new devices was a challenging task for IT administrators. Traditional CMTs (client management tools) lacked some features for a complete approach to endpoint management. The rise of UEM was also a result of the adoption of newer enterprise friendly platforms like Windows 10, and iOS 11.

As UEM platforms matured, support for hardware-backed security features such as secure boot, trusted platform modules (TPM), and operating system–level enrollment frameworks became increasingly important for automated provisioning and device compliance.

Differences between MDM, EMM and UEM

- MDM controls mobile device functionality and converts it into a single purpose or dedicated device. It has features like device enrollment, remote control, device lockdown, and location tracking
- EMM offers all MDM features, and also provides Mobile Information Management, Bring Your Own Device, Mobile Application Management and Mobile Content Management.
- UEM provides enterprises management of mobile devices as well as endpoints like desktops, printers, IoT devices and wearables from a single management platform.

== See also ==
- Mobile device management
- Enterprise mobility management
- Mobile security
- List of Mobile Device Management software
