= Opera Dragonfly =

Web developer tool integrated in the Opera browser

- Developer(s): Opera Software
- Stable release: 1.2012.12.14.1 / December 14, 2012; 12 years ago
- Preview release: 1.2012.12.14.1
- Operating system: Cross-platform
- License: Apache License 2.0
- Website: http://www.opera.com/dragonfly/

Opera Dragonfly is a web development tool that was integrated into the Opera web browser from Opera versions 9.5 through 12.18, similar to Firebug and development tools built into Mozilla Firefox and Google Chrome.

It supports debugging JavaScript, viewing the DOM, monitoring network traffic, previewing resources, editing colors, etc. It also supports remote debugging, which allows using the features of Dragonfly to be used when debugging a mobile phone, TV, or another desktop computer.

Opera Dragonfly must be downloaded on first usage, and functions offline thereafter. Opera Dragonfly automatically updates to the latest version available, when connected to the Internet.

Opera Dragonfly is compatible with Presto 2.1 and later, specifically Opera Mobile 9.5 and above, and Opera Desktop 9.5 and above.

The Scope transport protocol (STP) is used for communication between the Opera browser and Opera Dragonfly.

== History ==
Development of Opera Dragonfly started in May 2008. When the development started Opera Dragonfly was using the BSD license, but later on it was changed to the Apache License 2.0.

On 21 September 2011, the Opera Dragonfly team announced that from then on releases would be more focused on improvements to individual components, e.g. the DOM inspector or the UI framework. As soon as a feature for a certain component was implemented, it would be put on the experimental path for some initial testing. As part of the new release strategy, they switched over Opera Dragonfly to a new version scheme: <major-version>.<year>.<month>.<date>.<today's-build>.

Inclusion of Opera Dragonfly ended after Opera 12.x, when Opera switched from the Presto layout engine to Blink and a Chromium base. Subsequent versions included Chromium's DevTools instead. As of 2019, Dragonfly has not been reintroduced, although in 2013, indication was given that it might at some point return.

== See also ==
- Web development tools
- Internet Explorer Developer Toolbar
- Firebug (web development)
