= VisBug =

Google Chrome extension

- Repository: github.com/GoogleChromeLabs/ProjectVisBug
- Written in: JavaScript
- License: Apache License
- Website: https://visbug.web.app/

VisBug is a Google open-source chromium extension toolbar. It was released in 2018 and was marketed as FireBug for frontend web design. It has tools for changing web page layouts and helps for doing small CSS edits.

== Features ==
1. Move tool
2. Image swap
3. Margin tool
