= Parakey =

- Developers: Blake Ross, Joe Hewitt
- Operating system: Cross-platform
- Type: Operating system
- Website: www.parakey.com

Parakey is a web-based computer user interface proposed by Firefox contributors Blake Ross and Joe Hewitt. Ross describes it as "a Web operating system that can do everything an OS can do." The idea behind it is to make image, video, and writing transfer to the web easier. He explains that the current problem with transferring data to the web is that in order to move an image onto the web you first have to transfer pictures from your digital camera, then upload them to a place like Flickr. Or, if you want to rant, you launch a blog on blogger.com before you can start talking.

On July 20, 2007 Parakey was bought by Facebook for an undisclosed sum. The purchase also included the developers' assistance in progressing Facebook. Parakey was Facebook, Inc's first acquisition.
