= JQT =

JQT may refer to:

- JQT (band), a Korean girl group
- jQT (software), a JavaScript library
