= Joe Hewitt (programmer) =

Software programmer

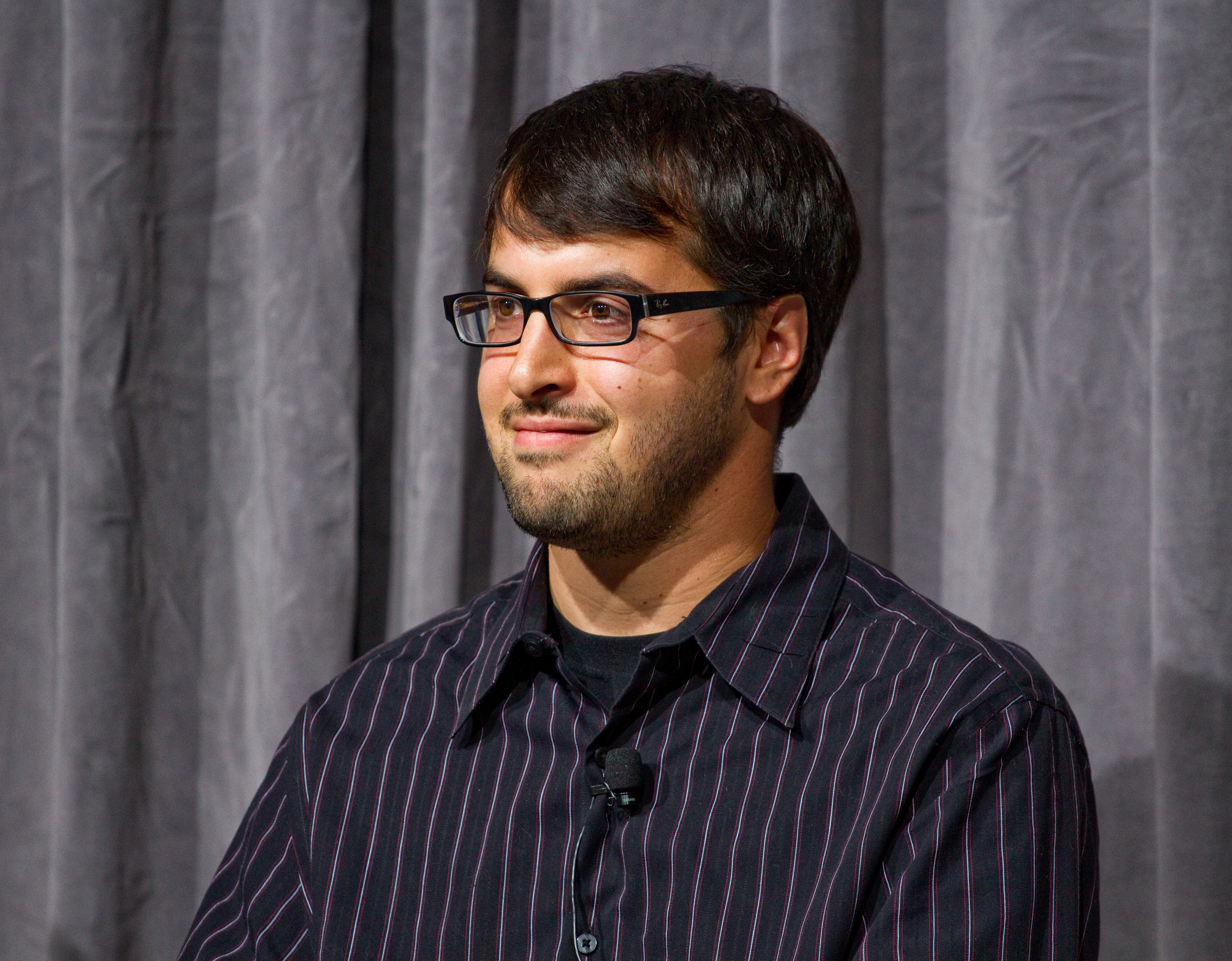
- Joe Hewitt at YUIConf in 2010
- Born: 1978 (age 47–48); Hopatcong, New Jersey
- Occupation: programmer
- Known for: Facebook for iPhone, Firebug, iUI, and early Firefox

Joe Hewitt (born 1978) is an American software programmer who is best known for his work on the Firefox web browser and related software development tools like Firebug and DOM Inspector.

== Education ==
His first project took place while still attending Hopatcong High School.

== Career ==
Hewitt created the website Feff World with Douglas Palermo.

From 2000 to 2003, he worked on UI programming at Netscape. Subsequently, he worked on AOL's Boxely UI project, which renders software such as AIM Triton and AOL Explorer. In July 2007, Hewitt led the release of the iUI user interface library which greatly simplified Safari development for Apple's iPhone.

He has been working on Parakey with Blake Ross. Parakey was acquired by Facebook in July 2007.

In August 2007, he wrote the iPhone-specific version of Facebook. He was responsible for creating Facebook’s iPhone app, which as of 2009 was the most downloaded iPhone app of all time. In November 2009, Hewitt ceased development on the application, citing Apple policies. In January 2009, he released the open-source library for iPhone developers Three20.

In 2011, Hewitt left Facebook.
