= Blake Ross =

American software developer

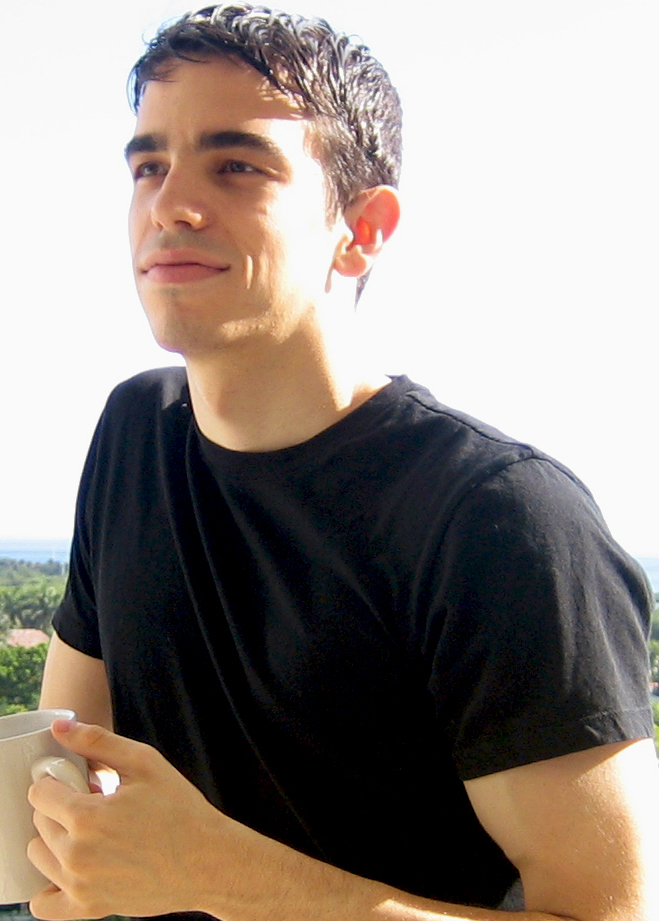
- Ross, London, UK, 2005
- Born: June 12, 1985 (age 41); Miami, Florida, U.S.
- Education: Stanford University
- Occupation: Software developer
- Employer: Entrepreneur
- Known for: Creator of Firefox

Blake Aaron Ross (born June 12, 1985) is an American software engineer who is best known for his work as the co-creator of the Mozilla Firefox web browser with Dave Hyatt. In 2005, he was nominated for Wired magazine's top Rave Award, Renegade of the Year, opposite Larry Page, Sergey Brin and Jon Stewart. He was also a part of Rolling Stone magazine's 2005 hot list. From 2007, he worked for Facebook as Director of Product until resigning in early 2013.

== Early life and education ==
Born on June 12, 1985 in Miami, Florida. He has an older brother and sister. Ross created his first website via America Online at the age of 10. By middle school, an interest in SimCity led him to piece together a couple of rudimentary videogames. He attended high school in Miami at Gulliver Preparatory School, graduating in 2003 while simultaneously working for Mozilla, based in California. Ross graduated from Stanford University in 2007. He is of Jewish descent.

== Mozilla and Firefox ==
Ross is most well known for co-founding the Mozilla Firefox project with Dave Hyatt. Ross discovered Netscape very soon after it open-sourced and began contributing, his mother's frustrated user experience with Internet Explorer being the main driver. He worked as an intern at Netscape Communications Corporation at the age of 16. In 2003, he enrolled at Stanford University. While interning at Netscape, Ross became disenchanted with the browser he was working on and the direction given to it by America Online, which had recently purchased Netscape. Ross and Hyatt envisioned a smaller, easy-to-use browser that could have mass appeal, and Firefox was born from that idea. The open source project gained momentum and popularity, and in 2003 all of Mozilla's resources were devoted to the Firefox and Thunderbird projects. Released in November 2004, when Ross was 19, Firefox quickly grabbed market share (primarily from Microsoft's Internet Explorer), with 100 million downloads in less than a year.

Ross is the author of Firefox For Dummies (ISBN 0-471-74899-4; published January 11, 2006).

== Career ==
Ross founded a new startup with another ex-Netscape employee, Joe Hewitt (the creator of Firebug who was also largely responsible for Firefox's interface and code). Ross and Hewitt worked on creating Parakey, a new user interface designed to bridge the gap between the desktop and the web. Ross revealed several technical details about the program and his new company when featured on the cover of IEEE Spectrum in November 2006.

On July 20, 2007, the BBC reported that Facebook had purchased Parakey.

In early 2013, Ross left Facebook to pursue other interests.

In 2015, Ross wrote a spec screenplay for HBO's Silicon Valley.

Ross took a job with Uber in August 2017.

== Personal life ==
Ross has aphantasia, a rare condition preventing him from visualizing things in his mind. In a blog post, Ross wrote:

I have never visualized anything in my entire life. I can’t "see" my father's face or a bouncing blue ball, my childhood bedroom or the run I went on ten minutes ago. I thought "counting sheep" was a metaphor. I’m 30 years old and I never knew a human could do any of this.

In 2015, he wrote a fan fiction original screenplay for the HBO television comedy series Silicon Valley, which gained attention.
