= IUI (software) =

Open-source web application framework

iUI
- Developer(s): Joe Hewitt
- Initial release: July 5, 2007
- Stable release: 0.4 / August 6, 2009; 15 years ago
- Written in: HTML, JavaScript, CSS
- Operating system: Android, iOS, webOS
- Platform: Mobile web applications
- Type: Web application framework
- License: New BSD License
- Website: www.iui-js.org

iUI is a lightweight open source Web application framework consisting of a JavaScript library, Cascading Style Sheets (CSS), and images for developing advanced mobile web applications (webapps). It allows developers unfamiliar with programming languages such as Objective-C, or who don't want to build native applications using proprietary software development kits (SDKs), to use plain HTML, CSS, and JavaScript to build native-looking webapps.

Originally known as iphonenav, iUI was created by Joe Hewitt specifically for iPhone developers with the goal to "turn ordinary standards-based HTML into a polished, usable interface that meets the high standards set by Apple's own native iPhone apps." It gave web applications running on Safari the look of a native application built with the iOS SDK.

Currently, iUI supports most smartphones and tablets. Devices independently tested with the framework include: Palm Pre, HTC Dream/T-Mobile G1, HTC Magic/T-Mobile MyTouch 3G, HTC Hero/T-Mobile G2 Touch, Motorola CLIQ, Motorola Droid, Samsung Intercept, and all iOS devices.

iUI has been used to develop a variety of web-applications. Notable examples include Bank of America's Mobile Site and Adelphi University's Mobile Web Application Suite AU2Go.

== See also ==
- JQTouch
- JQuery Mobile
