= ViziApps =

- Developers: ViziApps, Inc.
- Platform: Android, iOS
- Website: viziapps.com

ViziApps is an online mobile application platform for creating native and web mobile applications for Android and iOS smartphones and tablets. The online service enables customers to build mobile apps without coding including both the design of the user experience and the design of data interfaces from many data source types. ViziApps also enables design extensions in JavaScript. The online ViziApps Studio is provided by ViziApps, Inc. based in Wellesley, Massachusetts.

== History ==
ViziApps was launched in November 2010 by Wellesley, Massachusetts startup MobiFlex Inc. Company CTO Michael Kuperstein worked on ViziApps technology while at his previous company, Metaphor Solutions Inc., a provider of interactive voice response solutions. Company CEO George Adams and Michael Kuperstein co-founded MobiFlex, Inc. to focus that technology on mobile app creation with no coding. They launched the ViziApps Studio in November 2010, after a 6-month private beta. Prior to that, Adams was CEO of network security firm Tectia Inc. The two men met at an IEEE Boston entrepreneurs meeting in September 2009. In December 2011, Kofax Inc. reported that they had invested $500,000 in MobiFlex and would use ViziApps as the platform for their mobile document capture applications solutions. MobiFlex was reportedly the first application creation service to enter the Google Apps Marketplace in March 2011. In February 2012, CEO Adams commented that ViziApps’ customer base had grown from approximately 2,000 to 3,500 companies.

== Features ==
According to the company, ViziApps is intended to help businesses, as well as managers and IT teams in enterprises, develop and launch mobile apps much faster and avoid high development costs. The online tool lets users design a native or web mobile app by dropping mobile app fields onto a smartphone or tablet canvas and then moving and scaling them into place. It also has a no-coding approach to data management by enabling users to design data queries in a graphical tree. Users are given the option of building an application from scratch or customizing one using a variety of templates.

All mobile app fields can be placed in free-form and can overlap allowing creative image effects. A storyboard feature is provided to let users maintain the overall context of the application while working on individual pages. Page features include: custom backgrounds, text fields, pickers, images, buttons, switches, check boxes, charts, GPS, alerts, RSS feeds and hidden fields.

The buttons enable multiple actions including page navigation, emailing, texting, photo taking, calling a phone, capturing a signature, popping up a web page, recording audio, bar code scanning and calling custom JavaScript. Application properties include push notification, near field communications, setting the background and adding a navigation bar.

The no-coding approach to data management is done by using a drag and drop process to match mobile app fields to data fields. ViziApps mobile apps are able to access back-end data across the Internet in Google Spreadsheets, all SQL databases, Intuit QuickBase, Salesforce and REST Web Services.

App users are automatically updated in the event of any subsequent changes to the application design. ViziApps supports creation of mobile apps for iPhone, iPad, and Android-based smartphones and tablets.
