= JQT (software) =

Open-source Zepto/JQuery plugin

jQT (formerly jQTouch)
- Developer(s): David Kaneda and maintained by Jonathan Stark
- Stable release: 1 beta 4
- Written in: HTML, JavaScript, CSS
- Operating system: Android, iOS, webOS, WebKit
- Platform: Mobile web applications
- Type: Web application framework
- License: MIT License
- Website: www.jqtouch.com

jQT (formerly jQTouch) is an open-source Zepto/ JQuery plugin with native animations, automatic navigation, and themes for mobile WebKit browsers like iPhone, G1 (Android), and Palm Pre. It enables programmers to develop mobile applications with a native look and feel for the target device using HTML, CSS, and JavaScript.

jQT tries to emulate mobile platforms, like the iOS SDK, as much as possible even enabling the use of the Webkit application offline.

== See also ==
- JQuery
- iUI
- JQuery Mobile
