= Index of articles related to BlackBerry OS =

A list of BlackBerry-related topics

== 3 ==
- 3G
- 4G

== A ==
- Accelerometer
- Advanced Wireless Services#BlackBerry
- ALX (Application Loader File)
- Amazon MP3
- Appcelerator
- Application development
- Application programming interface
- Application software
- ARM architecture

== B ==
- Barcode
- Biblical software
- BlackBerry App World
- BlackBerry Enterprise Server
- BlackBerry Internet Service
- BlackBerry Messenger
- BlackBerry OS
- BlackBerry Planet
- BlackBerry PlayBook
- BlackBerry Tablet OS
- BlackBerry thumb
- Bluetooth profile

== C ==
- C++
- Cloud computing
- Computing platform

== D ==
- Db4o (object database)
- Digital camera
- Digital distribution
- Digital newspaper technology
- Documents To Go
- DragonRAD

== E ==
- E-book
- Eclipse (software)
- Email

== F ==
- Adobe Flash Lite
- Flash memory
- Foursquare (service)
- Free software license

== G ==
- Geolocation
- Google Maps
- Google Talk
- Graphical user interface

== H ==
- Handango
- HTML5

== I ==
- Inter@ctive Pager
- Internet tablet
- Iris Browser

== J ==
- JAD (file format)

== L ==
- LastPass
- List of best-selling mobile phones
- List of BlackBerry applications
- List of BlackBerry products
- List of BlackBerry 10 devices
- List of digital distribution platforms for mobile devices
- List of operating systems
- List of rich web application frameworks
- Location awareness
- Location-based game
- Location-based service
- Lotus Domino

== M ==
- Microsoft Exchange
- MIDP
- Mobile app development
- Mobile browser
- Mobile game
- Mobile Internet device (MID)
- Mobile operating system
- Mobile OS
- Mobile TV
- Mobile Web
- Mobitex
- MXit

== N ==
- Nettop
- Novell GroupWise
- NTP, Inc. (Patent litigation)

== O ==
- OpenGL ES

== P ==
- PaltalkScene
- PBKDF2
- Personal communicator
- Personal digital assistant (PDA)
- PhoneGap
- PocketMac
- Portable media player
- Proprietary software
- Push e-mail
- Push technology

== Q ==
- Qik
- QNX
- QNX4FS
- QR Code
- Qt (software)
- QWERTY

== R ==
- Real-time operating system (RTOS)
- Reduced instruction set computing
- Research In Motion (RIM)

== S ==
- Screenshot
- SDRAM
- Shazam (music app)
- Skia Graphics Engine
- Smartphone
- SMS
- SQLite
- SureType
- SyncML

== T ==
- Tablet computer
- Touchscreen
- Trackball
- Trackpad
- Trackwheel
- Truphone

== U ==
- Unlicensed Mobile Access (UMA)
- Ultra-Mobile PC

== V ==
- Vlingo
- Visual voicemail
- Voice dialing

== W ==
- Wattpad
- WebKit
- Wireless
- Where.com
