= Mobile app development =

Process to build apps for various mobile operating systems

Mobile app development is the act or process by which a mobile app is developed for one or more mobile devices, which can include personal digital assistants (PDA), enterprise digital assistants (EDA), or mobile phones. Such software applications are specifically designed to run on mobile devices, after considering many hardware constraints. Common constraints include central processing unit (CPU) architecture and speeds, available random-access memory (RAM), limited data storage capacities, and considerable variation in displays (technology, size, dimensions, resolution) and input methods (buttons, keyboards, touch screens with or without styluses). These applications (or 'apps') can be pre-installed on phones during manufacturing or delivered as web applications, using server-side or client-side processing (e.g., JavaScript) to provide an "application-like" experience within a web browser.

The mobile app development sector has experienced significant growth in Europe. A 2017 report from the Progressive Policy Institute estimated there were 1.89 million jobs in the app economy across the European Union (EU) by January 2017, marking a 15% increase from the previous year. These jobs include roles such as mobile app developers and other positions supporting the app economy.

== Overview ==
To facilitate developing applications for mobile devices, and the consistency thereof, various approaches have been taken.

Most companies that ship a product (e.g., Apple, iPod/iPhone/iPad) provide an official software development kit (SDK). They may also opt to provide some form of software testing and/or quality assurance (QA). In exchange for being provided the SDK or other tools, it may be necessary for a prospective developer to sign some form of non-disclosure agreement (NDA), which restricts the sharing of privileged information.

As part of the development process, mobile user interface (UI) design is an essential step in the creation of mobile apps. Mobile UI designers consider constraints, contexts, screen space, input methods, and mobility as outlines for design. Constraints in mobile UI design, which include the limited attention span of the user and form factors such as a mobile device's screen size for a user's hand(s). Mobile UI context includes signal cues from user activity, such as the location where or the time when the device is in use, that can be observed from user interactions within a mobile app. Such context clues can be used to provide automatic suggestions when scheduling an appointment or activity or to filter a list of various services for the user.

The user is often the focus of interaction with their device, and the interface entails components of both hardware and software. User input allows for the users to manipulate a system, and the device's output allows the system to indicate the effects of the users' manipulation.

Overall, mobile UI design's goal is mainly for an understandable, user-friendly interface. Functionality is supported by mobile enterprise application platforms or integrated development environments (IDEs).

Developers of mobile applications must also consider a large array of devices with different screen sizes, hardware specifications, and configurations because of intense competition in mobile hardware and changes within each of the platforms.

Today, mobile apps are usually distributed via an official online outlet or marketplace (e.g., Apple: The App Store – Google: Google Play) and there is a formalized process by which developers submit their apps for approval and inclusion in those marketplaces. Historically, however, that was not always the case.

Mobile UIs, or front-ends, rely on mobile back-ends to support access to enterprise systems. The mobile back-end facilitates data routing, security, authentication, authorization, working off-line, and service orchestration. This functionality is supported by a mix of middleware components, including mobile app servers, mobile backend as a service (MBaaS), and service-oriented architecture (SOA) infrastructure.

== Platform ==
The software development packages needed to develop, deploy, and manage mobile apps are made from many components and tools which allow a developer to write, test, and deploy applications for one or more target platforms.

=== Front-end development tools ===
Front-end development tools are focused on the user interface and user experience (UI-UX) and provide the following abilities:

- UI design tools
- SDKs to access device features
- Cross-platform accommodations/support

Notable tools are listed below.

==== First party ====
First party tools include official SDKs published by, or on behalf of, the company responsible for the design of a given hardware platform (e.g., Apple, Google, etc.), and any third-party software that is officially supported for the purpose of developing mobile apps for that hardware.

Platform	Programming language	Debuggers available	Emulator available	Integrated development environment available	Cross-platform deployment	Installer packaging options	Development tool cost
Android	Java but portions of code can be in C, C++, Kotlin	Debugger integrated in Eclipse, standalone debugging monitor available	Yes	Eclipse, IntelliJ IDEA, Android Studio, Project Kenai Android plugin for NetBeans	Android only, because of Dalvik VM, March 2009	apk	Free, IntelliJ IDEA Community Edition - Free
BlackBerry	Java	Debugger integrated in IDE	Yes	Eclipse, BlackBerry JDE	BlackBerry only, because of RIM API	alx, cod	Free
iOS SDK	Objective-C, Swift	LLDB debugger integrated in Xcode IDE	Bundled with iPhone SDK, integrated with Xcode IDE	Xcode	iPhone, iPad, iPod Touch	Only via App Store, needs review and approval by Apple Inc.	Apple tools are available for free for development on Mac. Applications can be run in a simulator or on a device. Some advanced abilities need a paid developer account.
iOS SDK	Object Pascal	Debugger integrated in Xcode IDE	Included in Delphi XE2 professional or higher	Embarcadero Delphi XE2	iPhone, iPad, iPod Touch	Only via App Store, needs review and approval by Apple Inc.	Development requires Intel-based Mac besides the IDE on Windows. Design is on Windows. Compiling and deploying is on Mac. Simulator testing is free, but installing on a device needs a fee for a developer signing key

==== Second party ====
Platform	Programming language	Debuggers available	Emulator available	Integrated development environment available	Cross-platform deployment	Installer packaging options	Development tool cost
Java ME	Java	Yes	Free emulator, Sun Java Wireless Toolkit, mpowerplayer	Eclipse, LMA NetBeans Mobility Pack	Yes although many VM implementations have device specific bugs necessitating separate builds	Jad/Jar packaging; PRC files under Palm OS	Free

==== Third party ====
Platform	Programming language	Debuggers available	Emulator available	Integrated development environment available	Cross-platform deployment	Installer packaging options	Development tool cost
MobileTogether	XPath/XQuery, Action Trees visual programming language	Yes	Yes	Proprietary IDE on Windows only	Android, iOS, Windows, browser	The native distribution for each format	Free
App Inventor for Android	Visual blocks-based programming language, with Interface designer	Limited debugging tools built into IDE	Yes	Web-based interface designer, with connection to Java web-start program for blocks programming	Android devices	apk	Free
Appcelerator	JavaScript	Yes, in Titanium Studio.	Emulator is available using native emulators	Titanium Studio based on Eclipse	Android, iPhone; BlackBerry, Tizen, mobile web	The native distribution format of each platform	Free, open-sourced Apache 2.0 licensed, commercial and enterprise licenses available
Basic4android	Visual Basic similar syntax	Yes	Emulator is available using native emulators	Proprietary IDE	Android	The native distribution format of each platform	Commercial licenses available
Codename One	Java	Yes	Yes	Eclipse, Netbeans	Android, iPhone, BlackBerry, Windows Mobile, J2ME	The native distribution format of each platform	Open Source GPLv2 and subscription-based build server
Solar2D	Lua	Yes	Yes	Xcode	Android, iOS, Nook Color	Native deployment for each platform	Free using MIT license
DragonRAD	Visual drag & drop tiles	Yes	Uses third-party emulators	Proprietary IDE	Android, BlackBerry, Windows Mobile	OTA deployment	Free & commercial licenses available
GeneXus for Mobile and Smart Devices	Knowledge representation and declarative programming-modeling for easy development, then code is automatically generated for each platform	GeneXus utilizes pre-tested code libraries and user debugging of code not necessary after code generation.	Publish in the cloud, test native in the device, no emulator needed	Proprietary IDE	Android, iOS (iPhone, iPad), BlackBerry OS, and even HTML5 if needed	The native distribution format of each platform and also cloud-browser-based	Free to try, commercial and enterprise licenses available
IBM MobileFirst Studio	HTML5, CSS3, JavaScript, and native SDK languages w/ Native Worklight API	Yes, Mobile Browser Simulator or integration with Native SDK Debugger	Emulator is available using native emulators or Browser Simulator w/ Cordova Plugin	Eclipse plugin, Eclipse-based stand-alone	Android, iOS, BlackBerry 6,7, & 10, Windows Phone 7.5 & 8, Windows 8 (desktop, tablets), Adobe AIR, Mobile Web App, desktop browser web page	The native distribution format of each platform	Developer edition free via Eclipse Marketplace, commercial license for deployment
Lazarus	Object Pascal	Yes, can debug in IDE via ActiveSync for Windows CE	Uses the emulators of the platforms	Lazarus IDE, including integrated GUI designer and debugger	Compiled language available for Windows CE, Linux-based devices, Symbian port in development	The native distribution format of each platform	Free
LambdaNative	Scheme	No	No but can build and test on the localhost	Eclipse (software) (optional)	All native binaries: Android, iOS, BlackBerry 10, Windows, OS X, Linux, OpenBSD, OpenWrt	The native distribution format of each platform	Free (BSD license)
LiveCode	LiveCode	Yes (integrated into IDE)	Yes (iOS and Android emulators may be used)	Yes	iOS, Android, macOS, Windows, Linux, server, HTML5. Installer packaging	The native distribution format of each platform	free open-source edition, commercial and enterprise editions available
Macromedia Flash Lite	ActionScript	Yes	Bundled with IDE	Macromedia Flash MX2004/8, Eclipse	Yes	SIS-CAB deployment or OTA-IR-Bluetooth SWF files	Varies, free but limited with MTASC
Marmalade	C, C++	Yes	Yes	Visual Studio, Xcode	All native: Android, BlackBerry, BREW, iOS (iPhone), Maemo, Palm-webOS, Samsung bada, Symbian, Windows Mobile 6.x and desktop, OS X	The native distribution format of each platform	Commercial licenses available
Monaca	HTML5, CSS, JavaScript	Yes	Preview is available on cloud IDE and local tool	Cloud-based IDE, Visual Studio, third-party IDE/editors	Android, iOS, windows8.1, 10	The native distribution format of each platform	Free, up to 3 projects. Commercial and enterprise license available
Mono for Android	C#	Yes	Yes	Visual Studio 2005 and MonoDevelop	Android	The native distribution format of the platform	
MonoTouch	C#	Yes	Yes	Visual Studio 2005 and MonoDevelop	iOS	The native distribution format of the platform	
MoSync	C, C++, Lua, HTML5, CSS, JavaScript	Yes	Yes	Eclipse, Visual Studio 2005 and later, MoBuild w/ text editors	Android, iOS (iPhone), Java ME, Moblin, Smartphone 2003, Symbian, Windows Mobile (Pocket PC), Blackberry (experimental)	SIS, CAB, JAD, JAR, APK, OTA deployment	Free, GPL 2.0, Free Indie Subscription; commercial subscription available
NetBeans	C++, Java	Yes	Yes	Java development tools	Android (Mobile and Tablet), Nokia (Symbian, Seria 60 – 40 – 80), etc...		Free
OpenPlug	ActionScript, XML	Yes	Yes	OpenPlug ELIPS plugin for Adobe Flash Builder	Android, iOS (iPad, iPhone, iPod Touch), Symbian, Windows Mobile	The native distribution format of each platform	Free & commercial licenses available
OutSystems	OutSystems, CSS, JavaScript	Yes	Test directly in browser	OutSystems Service Studio	Android, iOS, Windows Phone 7	NA	Free community edition for personal use, or subscription licensing for commercial use
PhoneGap and Apache Cordova	HTML, CSS, JavaScript	Yes	Yes A lot of functionality can be tested directly in browser. Running native emulators on iOS and Android is also possible.	Yes Many IDEs exist for Cordova-based tools like Ionic Studio or Appery.io	iPhone, Android, Tizen, Windows Phone, BlackBerry, Symbian, Palm, Bada	The native distribution format of each platform	Apache 2
Qt SDK	C++, QML	Yes	Yes	Qt Creator	Android (technology preview), iOS (technology preview), Symbian, Maemo, MeeGo, Linux, Windows, OS X	The native distribution format of each platform	Free and commercial licenses available
Rhomobile	Ruby with HTML interface features compiled through an interpreter into native applications	Yes	N/A, applications can run in Win32 runner, or in device emulators for supported platforms.	Xcode or Eclipse, on-demand RhoHub version includes full IDE	Yes, supports Android 1.6+, iOS 3.0+ (iPhone, iPad), Windows Mobile 6.1 Professional, Windows Mobile 6.0 Standard, BlackBerry 4.6, 4.7, 5.0, 6.0 (4.2 and 4.5 supported but database access is very slow on these devices), Symbian	OTA deployment, iOS through App store, .SIS, .CAB, .APK, .COD	Rhodes is free and open source under the MIT License, RhoSync is under GPL or commercial, Commercial support available. Subscription for RhoHub
RubyMotion	Ruby	Yes	Yes	Any text editor. As an IDE, RubyMine.	Android, iOS	The native distribution format of the platform	RubyMotion is a commercial product.
Sencha Touch	HTML, CSS, JavaScript	Yes	Yes	Sencha Architect 2	Android, iOS (iPhone, iPad, iPod touch), Kindle, BlackBerry, Bada	Web delivered, or hybrid via native shells for each platform	GPLv3, free for commercial, paid for OEM and embedded systems
Smartface	WYSIWYG design editor with JavaScript code editor	Yes	Yes	Smartface IDE and SDK	Yes Android, iOS (iPhone, iPad, iPod touch), Kindle, Gear, Google Glass	The native distribution format of each platform	Community license and commercial licenses available
Stencyl	Drag-and-drop editor based on Scratch, Objective-C	Yes	Yes	Xcode	iOS (iPad, iPhone, iPod Touch)	The native distribution format of each platform	Free and commercial development licenses
Telerik Platform, and AppBuilder	HTML5, CSS and Javascript	Yes	Test right in browser or device	In-browser client, desktop client, Visual Studio, Sublime Text or command-line interface (CLI)	Android, iOS, Windows phone	The native distribution format of each platform	Free to try, commercial and enterprise licenses available
Unity	C#, JavaScript, Boo, other .NET-based languages	Yes	Remote used to simulate device interaction before app is uploaded to the device.	Unity Editor, also works with Visual Studios and MonoDevelop.	Android, iOS (iPhone, iPad), PC, Mac, desktop browser, Xbox 360, PS3, Wii. BlackBerry Playbook, Nokia Symbian, Roku 2 and others available through company's Union program.	Native distribution format of each platform	Free and commercial development licenses.
Verivo AppStudio	WYSIWYG, graphical drag and drop, JavaScript, .NET-based languages; replaced by Appery.io	Yes	Test right in browser or device	Proprietary design studio	Android, iOS, Blackberry	Native distribution format of each platform	Free development licenses; per-CPU deployment licenses
ViziApps	WYSIWYG, graphical drag and drop	Yes	Test right in browser or device	Online design studio	Android, iOS, Windows Phone planned	The native distribution format of each platform	Free to design, test, demo, update, app; fee to publish
V-Play Engine	Objective-C, C++, JavaScript, QML, Java	Yes	Yes	Qt Creator	All Platforms	The native distribution format of each platform	Free, Indie and Enterprise licenses are available
Xamarin	C#	Yes	Yes	Xamarin Studio (Mac only; deprecated), Visual Studio (Windows only), Visual Studio for Mac (Mac only; replaced Xamarin Studio)	Android, iOS, Windows Phone, Windows Store apps	The native distribution of each platform	Free community edition, pro edition included in Microsoft MSDN licensing
Xojo	Xojo (similar to VB)	Yes	Yes	Xojo IDE	iOS, mobile web apps	iOS apps are native iPad	Free trial with no time limit; commercial licenses available

=== Back-end servers ===
Back-end tools pick up where the front-end tools leave off, and provide a set of reusable services that are centrally managed and controlled and provide the following abilities:

- Integration with back-end systems
- User authentication-authorization
- Data services
- Reusable business logic

Available tools include:

Platform	Programming language	Integrated development environment available	Cross-platform deployment	Deployment options	Development tool cost
Altova MobileTogether Server	Browser-based interface	Proprietary IDE	Server available for Windows, Linux, macOS. Supports mobile devices running Android, iOS, Windows 8, Windows 10 Windows Phone, HTML5 browser-based client	On-prem, cloud, or hybrid	Development tools are free, commercial license needed for deployment
Metismo	Java	Eclipse	Android, iOS (iPhone, iPad), Java ME, BREW, BlackBerry, Nintendo DS, Palm/webOS, Sony PSP, Samsung bada, Symbian, Windows Mobile, Windows Phone 7, Windows Desktop, OS X	On-prem	Commercial licenses available
Verivo Akula	Java	Use any front-end IDE	Android, iOS (iPhone, iPad), Windows Phone7	On-prem, cloud, or hybrid	Free development licenses; per-CPU deployment licenses. Replaced by Appery.io

=== Security add-on layers ===
With bring your own device (BYOD) becoming the norm within more enterprises, IT departments often need stop-gap, tactical solutions that layer atop existing apps, phones, and platform component. Features include

- App wrapping for security
- Data encryption
- Client actions
- Reporting and statistics

=== System software ===
Many system-level components are needed to have a functioning platform for developing mobile apps.

Platform	Programming language	Debuggers available	Emulator available	Integrated development environment available	Cross-platform deployment	Installer packaging options	Development tool cost
Adobe AIR	ActionScript, HTML, CSS, JavaScript	Yes	Yes	Flash Builder, Flash Professional, IntelliJ IDEA	Android, iOS (iPhone, iPad, iPod touch), BlackBerry	The native distribution format of each platform	Flash Builder, Flash Professional, IntelliJ IDEA - commercial licenses available Adobe AIR SDK (command line tool) - Free
BREW	C; the APIs are provided in C with a C++ style interface	Debugger support for the native ARM target code. Can use Visual Studio to debug the x86 testing code	No Emulator for the target ARM code, has a simulator for the x86 testing code	Visual Studio 6.0, Visual Studio 2003 .NET, Visual Studio 2005	Compile for the specific BREW version available on the handset	OTA	Related dev fees typically needed for Brew App Certification - VeriSign annual fee for becoming a certified developer. Realview ARM compiler for BREW (the free GNU C/C++ is available, but with limited function and support). TRUE BREW testing fee for distributing the application.
Firefox OS	HTML5, CSS, JavaScript	Yes	No, but simulator available.	Firefox browser, Firebug	Web browser on other platform	Firefox Marketplace, Web URL	Development requires Mozilla Firefox and the simulator add-on
.NET Compact Framework	C#, VB.NET, Basic4ppc	Yes	Free emulator, source code available, also bundled with IDE	Visual Studio 2008, 2005, 2003, Basic4ppc IDE	Windows Mobile, Windows CE, Symbian-based devices via third-party tools	OTA deployment, CAB files, ActiveSync	Most tools free, but commercial editions of Visual Studio needed for visual designers
OpenFL	Haxe (similar to Actionscript and Java)	Yes	Yes	IntelliJ IDEA, FlashDevelop	Android, iOS (iPhone, iPad, iPod touch), BlackBerry Playbook, WebOS, HTML5, Flash, Windows (exe), Linux	The native distribution format of each platform	Free
Palm OS	C, C++, Pascal	Yes	OS 1.0–4.1: free emulator provided by PalmSource (Access); OS 5.0: - 5.4 device-specific simulators provided by Palm (palmOne)	Palm OS Development System (Eclipse), CodeWarrior, PocketStudio, HB++, Satellite Forms	Palm OS handhelds, or Windows Mobile with StyleTap emulator	PRC files, PalmSource Installer (.psi)	Free (POSE or GCC for Palm OS), or commercial (CodeWarrior), or various commercial rapid-development frameworks
Python	Python	Yes	Add-on to Nokia Emulator	Several, including plugins for Eclipse	Interpreted language available natively only on Nokia Series60 (and desktops) though ports exist to other mobile platforms, including Palm OS	Sis deployment with py2sis or can use Python Runtime	Free
Symbian	C++	Yes	Free emulator	Many choices	Compile per target	SIS deployment	Commercial and free tools available
Tizen	Web-based: HTML5, CSS, JavaScript Native: C, C++	Yes	Free emulator	Tizen SDK	Web-based app to be available on web browser	Tizen through App store, Web URL	Development needs Windows, OS X, or Ubuntu Desktop
Ubuntu Touch	Web-based: HTML5, CSS, JavaScript Native: QML, C, C++	Yes	Yes	Ubuntu SDK	HTML5 app to be available web browser.	Ubuntu Touch through App store, Web URL	Development requires Ubuntu Desktop 12.04 or higher, Free
webOS	JavaScript, CSS, HTML, C and C++ through the PDK	Yes	Free emulator	Eclipse	webOS, Palm only	OTA deployment, webOS through App store, Web URL, Precentral, .ipk	Free
Windows Mobile	C, C++	Yes	Free emulator (source code available), also bundled with IDE	Visual Studio 2010, 2008, 2005, eMbedded VC++ (free), Satellite Forms	Windows Mobile, Windows CE	OTA deployment, CAB files, ActiveSync	Free command-line tools or eMbedded VC++, or Visual Studio (Standard edition or better)
Windows Phone	C#, Visual Basic, C, C++	Yes	Free emulator, also bundled with IDE	Visual Studio 2012, Visual Studio 2010	Windows Phone	OTA deployment, XAP files	

Criteria for selecting a development platform usually include the target mobile platforms, existing infrastructure, and development skills. When targeting more than one platform with cross-platform development, it is also important to consider the impact of the tool on the user experience. Performance is another important criterion, as research on mobile apps indicates a strong correlation between application performance and user satisfaction. Along with performance and other criteria, the availability of the technology and the project's requirements may drive the development between native and cross-platform environments. To aid the choice between native and cross-platform environments, some guidelines and benchmarks have been published. Typically, cross-platform environments are reusable across multiple platforms, leveraging a native container while using HTML, CSS, and JavaScript for the user interface. In contrast, native environments are targeted at one platform for each of those environments. For example, Android development occurs in the Eclipse IDE using Android Developer Tools (ADT) plugins, Apple iOS development occurs using the Xcode IDE with Objective-C and/or Swift, Windows and BlackBerry each have their own development environments.

=== Mobile app testing ===
Mobile applications are first tested within the development environment using emulators and later subjected to field testing. Emulators provide an inexpensive way to test applications on mobile phones to which developers may not have physical access. The following are examples of tools used for testing applications across the most popular mobile operating systems.

- Google Android Emulator – an Android emulator that is patched to run on a Windows PC as a standalone app, without having to download and install the complete and complex Android SDK. It can be installed and Android compatible apps can be tested on it.
- The official Android SDK Emulator – a mobile device emulator which mimics all of the hardware and software features of a typical mobile device (without the calls).
- TestiPhone – a web browser-based simulator for quickly testing iPhone web applications. This tool has been tested and works using Internet Explorer 7, Firefox 2 and Safari 3.
- iPhoney – gives a pixel-accurate web browsing environment and it is powered by Safari. It can be used while developing web sites for the iPhone. It is not an iPhone simulator but instead is designed for web developers who want to create 320 by 480 (or 480 by 320) websites for use with iPhones. iPhoney will only run on OS X 10.4.7 or later.
- BlackBerry Simulator – There are a variety of official BlackBerry simulators available to emulate the functionality of actual BlackBerry products and test how the device software, screen, keyboard and trackwheel will work with the application.
- Windows UI Automation – To test applications that use the Microsoft UI Automation technology, it requires Windows Automation API 3.0. It is pre-installed on Windows 7, Windows Server 2008 R2 and later versions of Windows. On other operating systems, you can install it using Windows Update or download it from the Microsoft Web site.
- MobiOne Developer – a mobile Web integrated development environment (IDE) for Windows that helps developers to code, test, debug, package and deploy mobile Web applications to devices such as iPhone, BlackBerry, Android, and the Palm Pre. MobiOne Developer was officially declared End of Life by the end of 2014.

Tools include

- Eggplant Functional – GUI-based automated test tool for mobile apps across all operating systems and devices
- Ranorex – Test automation tools for mobile, web and desktop apps
- Testdroid – Real mobile devices and test automation tools for testing mobile and web apps

== Design principles ==
According to a 2020 Industry Report on Applications, 46% of mobile app users have stated that they have stopped using or uninstalled an app due to poor performance. Design experts advocate for the following design principles to create successful and effective mobile apps:

Clutter-free screens – Keeps interactions quick and simple, allowing users to focus on one specific task rather than being overwhelmed with multiple features and tasks. Design experts strongly advocate for one task per screen and recommend breaking down long forms into pages and progressively revealing new tasks or fields to minimize clutter.

Reduce cognitive load – Makes the use of the app as seamless as possible, and preserves natural flow through the app. Design experts suggest incorporating autocomplete, spell-check, predictive text assistance, and dropdown menus to reduce cognitive load. Design experts also recommend the state of the app be preserved when users temporarily leave the app and re-enter so that users can continue their use from where they left off.

Simple navigation – Around 11% of people have uninstalled apps due to their complicated interface. Design experts state it is paramount to present the navigation bar visibly in your app to help users navigate to frequently used and high-priority screens instantly. They suggest the use of recognizable icons specific to the device operating system to help users easily take actions such as opening a menu, changing settings, going back a screen, and searching within a page. According to them, a user should not be confused while navigating the app, so an orderly, clear, and logical navigation flow drives engagement and discovery in the app.

Notifications – It's reported that around 19% of users uninstall an app due to frequent push notifications. Notifications should be sent with careful planning according to design experts. Experts state notifications should be sent at a time most convenient to users in their time zone and the messages should be personalized to bring great value to them.

Speed appearance – About 19% of people uninstall apps due to hang up issues. Design experts state it's important to make sure the app is fast and responsive so that users don't have to wait for content. They state developers should deliver content faster or give the perception of progress. Some approaches suggested by the experts are the use of skeleton screens which show the layout of the app with content grayed out, progress bars or loading spinners, tasks being carried out in the background and delivering the content quickly when the user requests for it, or giving users some tasks or content while they are waiting for a page to load.

Usability – Approximately 85% of mobile users use their phone with one hand, thus design experts state it is important that the top-level menu, frequently used controls, and common action items are within the reach of the user's thumb. They also stress the importance of readability and it's recommended that the text size is at least 11 point font so that users can read it at the typical reading distance without zooming in. It is recommended that headers and titles on the app screens be San Francisco 17pt and Roboto 16sp for operating systems iOS and Android respectively. The experts also state there should be 4.5:1 minimum contrast ratio between text and the background color. Design experts strongly encourage developers to make apps accessible for all users including people with disabilities, so they suggest features such as voice navigation, screen reader compatibility, and user interface adaptability in mobile apps.

== Patents ==
Many patent applications are pending for new mobile phone apps. Most of these are in the technological fields of business methods, database management, data transfer, and operator interface.

== See also ==
- List of mobile app distribution platforms
- Lazy user model
- Mobile application management
- Mobile backend as a service
- Mobile business intelligence
- Mobile computing
- Mobile-device testing
- Mobile enterprise application platform
- Mobile games
- Mobile interaction
- Mobile marketing
- Mobile web development
- Mobile workflow
- Multi-channel app development
- MoSoSo, mobile social software
- On-Device Portal
- WURFL and WALL
- JQuery Mobile
- HTML5
