= SAP Mobile Platform =

Mobile enterprise application platform

SAP Mobile Platform (formerly Sybase Unwired Platform) is a mobile enterprise application platform designed to simplify the task of creating applications that connect business data to mobile devices for workflow management and back-office integration. SAP Mobile Platform provides a layer of middleware between heterogeneous back-end data sources, such as relational databases, enterprise applications and files, and the mobile devices that need to read and write back-end data.

Application developers write the business logic of a mobile application using the development tools in SAP Mobile Platform. The product automatically does the translation required to create customized versions of the new application for a wide variety of mobile devices and operating systems. The intent is to make it easier and faster to create complex applications that use multiple data sources and will work on many different mobile devices.

== History ==
Sybase first released Sybase Unwired Platform in 2008. Written in C and Java. Version 2.3 of the product was the first to be released as SAP Mobile Platform.

- Version 3.0: Released May 2014
- Version 2.3: Released end of 2013 as SAP Mobile Platform
- Version 2.2: Released in March 2013
- Version 2.1.3: Released in May 2012
- Version 2.1.2: Released February 2012
- Version 2.1.1: Released November 2011
- Version 2.1: Released September 2011
- Version 2.0: Released 2011
- Version 1.5.2: Released 2010
- Version 1.2: Released 2009
- Version 1.0: Released 2008

== Features ==
- Appcelerator
- Cordova support
- Mobile Analytics Kit (MAKit)
- Mobile SDK
- Hybrid Web Container
- 4GL tooling environment
- Eclipse plug-in
- Integrated mobile device management and application enablement
- Support for multiple device types, including Android, iOS, BlackBerry, Windows Mobile, and Windows laptops/tablets.
- Integrates with SAP, Remedy Corp, and other applications that leverage databases or service oriented architecture.
- Unwired Platform Runtime
- Secure access between mobile devices and a network

== Usage ==
To use Sybase Unwired Platform, a software developer drags and drops table names from a database list into a diagram, which creates what the product calls a "mobile business object." The Sybase Unwired Platform server uses that object to determine how data will be shared between the server and mobile clients, and then performs "code generation" to create customized versions for individual mobile platforms.

== Competitors ==
- Tokn: builds integrated enterprise apps for any system such as SAP, Oracle, IFS, SQL with all apps run native on Android, Microsoft and IOS.
- Syclo: Following SAP's acquisition, Syclo's Agentry solution became part of SAP Mobile Platform in its 2.3 release.
- KonyOne Platform
- Verivo
- Convertigo
- Nitro Mobile Solutions
- Appcelerator

== See also ==
- Mobile application management
- Mobile device
- Mobile device management
- Mobile enterprise application platform
- Cross-platform software
- Unwired enterprise
- Sybase
