= List of software using Electron =

This is a list of application software written using the Electron software framework to provide the graphical user interface.

== List ==
- 1Password
- Atom (discontinued)
- balenaEtcher
- Basecamp 3
- Beaker (web browser) (discontinued)
- Beekeeper Studio
- Bitwarden
- Cookie Clicker
- CrashPlan
- Cryptocat (discontinued)
- Delta Chat
- Discord
- Docker Desktop
- Dropbox
- Eclipse Theia
- Element
- Figma
- FreeTube
- GitHub Desktop
- GitKraken
- Joplin
- Keybase
- Lbry
- Light Table
- Logitech Options +
- LosslessCut
- Mattermost
- Microsoft Teams (formerly)
- Miro
- MongoDB Compass
- Mullvad
- Notion
- Obsidian
- OpenVPN Connect
- Postman
- QQNT
- Quasar Framework
- Samsung Magician
- Shift
- Signal
- Skype (discontinued)
- Slack
- SwitchHosts
- Symphony Chat
- Synergy
- Tabby
- Termius
- TIDAL
- Twitch
- Visual Studio Code
- WebTorrent
- WhatsApp (formerly)
- Wire
- Yammer
