= IBM Mobile =

IBM Mobile is a portfolio of mobile solutions for businesses offered by the information technology company IBM that includes software, cloud services, and partnerships.

== Overview ==
In 2013, IBM launched IBM MobileFirst, a mobile strategy that enables clients to streamline and accelerate mobile adoption. In 2016, IBM incorporated its mobile capabilities into its IBM Cloud portfolio, and the MobileFirst naming was discontinued. IBM has more than 4,300 patents in mobile, social and security, which have been incorporated into IBM Mobile solutions. that address the mobile challenges of industries such as Banking, Insurance, Retail, Transport, Telecom, Government, Healthcare and Automotive.

== Products and services ==
Products in the IBM Mobile portfolio include:

- IBM Mobile developer console - a single landing page for mobile developers to start creating mobile apps on IBM Cloud.
- IBM Bluemix - a cloud platform that provides mobile devices with IaaS and PaaS hybrid cloud services.
- IBM Mobile Foundation, formerly named Worklight - a mobile enterprise application platform that supports the development of HTML5, hybrid and native mobile applications. It can be used with most popular mobile development tools and includes an Eclipse-based IDE that allows mobile developers to make full use of HTML5 functionality and enhance these capabilities with utilities such as encryption of locally stored data, offline authentication, and 3rd-party library integration with frameworks such as PhoneGap, Sencha Touch, jQuery, and more.
- IBM MaaS360 - formerly a product of Fiberlink that was purchased by IBM in 2013.
- Cloudant - a NoSQL database-as-a-service (DBaaS) that allows mobile apps to store and access data locally on a mobile device and sync with the cloud, when online.

== Apple/IBM partnership ==
In July 2014, IBM and Apple announced a partnership to transform enterprise mobility through a new class of industry-specific business apps for iPhone and iPad. As part of the agreement, IBM, under the brand IBM MobileFirst for iOS, will create exclusive industry applications for iOS and use its services to bring iPads and iPhones to enterprises and corporations. Apple, on its end, introduced a special AppleCare program that provides 24/7 hardware support for devices for enterprises. The partnership offers Apple access to IBM’s customers and analytics capabilities to power enterprise apps for their devices. On December 10, 2014, Apple and IBM, in a joint statement, introduced 10 mobile apps for business. On December 16, 2015, the two announced the availability of over 100 enterprise apps. The apps provide solutions in a number of different industries such as banking, retail, insurance, financial services, telecommunications and government. Clients include enterprises such as Air Canada, Banorte, Citi and Sprint.
