= Monaca (software) =

Collection of software tools and services

- Developer: Asial Corporation
- Operating system: Web-application
- Type: Software framework
- Website: monaca.io

Monaca is a collection of software tools and services for building and deploying HTML5 mobile hybrid apps. Built using open-source Apache Cordova (formerly known as PhoneGap), it provides resources including Cloud IDE, local development tools, a debugger, and backend support.

== Overview ==
Monaca's cloud-based IDE builds HTML5 hybrid mobile apps for iOS, Android, Windows and Chrome Apps using HTML, CSS and, JavaScript. Multi-platform app development utilizes native language components and functionalities. Monaca is framework-agnostic, and provides integration with Onsen UI and Ionic Framework for building user interfaces.

== History ==
Asial released an open beta version of Monaca on 2 March 2012. The initial service was presented as a cloud-based environment for creating applications for the iPhone, iPad and Android devices from a common web-technology codebase. An inspector added in August of that year allowed developers to examine and edit HTML and CSS while debugging. The update also introduced support for PhoneGap 2.0.

The first production version was released on 12 September 2013. At launch, it supported applications for iOS, Android and Windows 8. The release added collaborative project management, file sharing, source-code checking and the ability to import and export projects.

In June 2014, Asial introduced an academic plan for educational institutions. It included an education-specific account tier and project-sharing features for students and teachers.

Monaca Localkit and Monaca CLI were released as production tools in June 2015. They allowed projects to be edited with local IDEs and code editors while retaining access to Monaca's cloud build and debugging services. The tools also supported local task runners and existing version control systems.

In 2020, Asial and CData Software introduced an integration that connected Monaca applications to relational databases and software as a service platforms through CData's API Server. At that time, Monaca was described as supporting mobile applications for iOS and Android, desktop applications for Windows and macOS, and web applications including single-page applications and progressive web apps.

== Platform and tools ==
The Monaca Cloud IDE runs in a web browser and provides source-code editing, application previews, project dependency management, version-control integration, cloud builds and distribution tools. Its version-control functions support GitHub as well as other Git services accessed through SSH.

Local development can be performed through the graphical Localkit application or Monaca CLI. Monaca Debugger provides live reloading and on-device testing, while the remote-build service produces iOS and Android packages without requiring the corresponding platform SDKs to be installed locally.

Monaca can be used with JavaScript frameworks including Angular, React and Vue.js. It is also integrated with Onsen UI, an open-source user-interface framework developed by the same company.

== See also ==
- Apache Cordova
- Mobile application development
