= MEAP =

MEAP may refer to:

- Canon MEAP (Multifunctional Embedded Application Platform), a software development kit for multifunction printers
- Mobile enterprise application platform, a development framework for mobile devices: iPhone, Android, Blackberry, Windows Phone, Web Mobile)
- Michigan Educational Assessment Program, a standardised school test
- MEAP Nisou, a Cypriot football club
- Meap, a fictional alien from Phineas and Ferb
