= Onsen UI =

Open-source UI framework

- Developer(s): Monaca, Inc. / Asial Corporation
- Initial release: 2013
- Stable release: 2.11.2 / January 12, 2021; 4 years ago
- Repository: www.github.com/OnsenUI/OnsenUI
- Written in: JavaScript
- Type: Software framework
- License: Apache License v2
- Website: www.onsen.io

Onsen UI is an open-source UI framework and components for HTML5 hybrid mobile app development, based on PhoneGap / Cordova. It allows developers to create mobile apps using Web technologies like CSS, HTML5, and JavaScript. While it was originally based on AngularJS and supported jQuery, with version 2, Onsen UI has become JavaScript framework-agnostic, meaning developers can create mobile apps with or without any JavaScript framework. Onsen UI also provides comprehensive tools and services through Monaca, as both products are developed by the same company. Onsen UI was created in 2013.
