= Appery.io =

App-building platform

- Developer: Exadel
- Release: 2012
- Website: https://appery.io/

Appery.io is a cloud-based HTML5, Ionic, jQuery Mobile, and hybrid app-building platform for developing mobile apps, web apps, and PWAs. Appery.io is a browser-based drag-and-drop visual builder tool that supports Android and iOS with integrated Apache Cordova/PhoneGap output. The platform is used by DIYers to create apps for their customers.

== History ==
Appery.io is a product of Exadel and was launched in 2012 under the name Tiggzi.

In 2013, at the TechCrunch Disrupt event in New York City, the platform formally relaunched as Appery.io. After the relaunch, Appery.io continued focusing on enterprise and business apps and began to support Salesforce and other similar enterprise systems. In 2013, Appery.io partnered with Heroku (a Salesforce.com subsidiary) to allow developers to use Heroku’s approach to provision their apps directly in the cloud. The integrated Appery.io features were meant to ease rapid development within Salesforce's back end and allowed customers with less extensive technical backgrounds to build mobile apps.

In 2014, Appery.io upgraded the platform and introduced new features: a new visual builder UI, an event-oriented mapping editor, and updates to the REST service editor.

Over the course of 2015:

- Appery.io introduced an Automatic App Update feature for publishing apps in app stores. Appery.io also updated its API Express, removing steps necessary to integrate enterprise systems, and increased application security with LDAP.
- Appery.io partnered with MetaCert, adding new security features to apps built with the platform; the integration of MetaCert security API via a plug-in checks the security of web links in real-time.
- Appery.io acquired Verivo software and integrated Verivo’s enterprise connectivity and security capabilities.
- Appery.io integrated Ionic into the platform, which lets developers build HTML5/hybrid apps on a single code base with native UX across all platforms.
- New features were added to the platform to simplify the way users log in to and test mobile applications on devices: Lightweight Directory Access Protocol (LDAP), social network identity support, and on-device app sharing without app stores.

In 2021, Appery.io added Ionic 5 support to the platform, which supports JavaScript frameworks (Angular, React, and Vue.js). The platform started to support the development of Progressive Web Applications (PWA).

In 2021, Appery.io won the 2021 Devies Award in the "Best Innovation in Mobile Development" category. The award is given annually as a part of the DeveloperWeek trade show.

== Platform ==
The platform comprises an app builder, back-end services, API Express, and plug-ins. The app builder provides cross-platform development with a common API running across iOS and Android. UX is built with Ionic, jQuery Mobile and HTML5 components by using drag-and-drop functionality. The Appery.io back-end services provide hosting, a MongoDB NoSQL database, push notifications, JavaScript server code, and a secure proxy. API Express helps sync Appery.io apps with back-end systems. The plug-ins connect the app to prepackaged REST API services, pages, and data binding.
