= Verivo =

American software company

Verivo Software Inc.
- Type: Limited company
- Industry: Computer software, IT services, IT consulting, enterprise mobility, mobile application management
- Founded: 1998
- Headquarters: Waltham, Massachusetts
- Key people: Gregg Bjork (COO), Tom Trometer (CFO), Coco Jaenicke (CMO), Satish Chitnis (VP Engineering)
- Number of employees: >100 (2012)
- Website: www.verivo.com

Verivo Software Inc. is an enterprise mobility software company, with headquarters in Waltham, Massachusetts. Verivo’s enterprise mobility platforms allow users to develop, secure and govern mobile applications across multiple devices.

In June 2015 Verivo has joined forces with Appery.io.

== History ==
Pyxis Mobile Inc. was founded in 1998 by Shane Hughes and Todd Christy as a company that developed PalmPilot apps for financial services companies. In July 2010, Steve Levy joined the company as CEO and transformed the company into Verivo Software Inc.

In January 2012, Verivo Software announced it had secured USD 17 million in funding from Commonwealth Capital Ventures and existing investors to develop new products and fund marketing programs. Simultaneously, the company announced its intention to refocus its business strategy, by moving away from the development and sale of mobile enterprise apps to directly offering its enterprise mobility platform to customers.

Verivo moved into new corporate headquarters in Waltham, MA, in January 2012. In February 2012, Verivo opened its first European office in London, UK.

In June 2015, Appery, LLC, announced it has acquired major assets of Verivo Software, including revenue contracts, source code, patents, trademarks and other intellectual property.

== Operations ==
Verivo counts six of the top 15 Fortune 500 companies, 28 of the top 50 global asset managers, 15 of the top 25 insurance carriers and three of the top five U.S. banks as clients. Verivo also serves customers in the retail, health and life science, manufacturing, higher education, government, real estate, transportation, and automotive industries globally. Customers include AXA, CHEP, Deutsche Bank, International SOS, Thomson Reuters and Toyota.

== Products ==
Verivo's first commercially available product, AppStudio, was launched in 2008. It is a mobile enterprise application platform (MEAP) that allows developers to build and deploy enterprise mobile apps through a drag-and-drop interface. As the industry began to demand more open and extensible platforms, Verivo launched Akula, a mobile app server. Both products are under active development today.

In addition, Verivo provides implementation services including concept building, graphic design, integration and testing services, cloud and on-premises hosting and training for its AppStudio IDE and Akula.

=== AppStudio ===
Verivo’s AppStudio allows users to centrally build, deploy, and manage cross-device native enterprise applications across multiple devices including iPhones, iPads, Android smartphones and tablets and Research In Motion’s BlackBerry devices.

It includes built-in security and built-in reporting capabilities. Verivo’s AppServer authenticates users, delivers app configurations, manages data synchronization, integrates with a wide range of data sources and more.

=== Akula ===
Akula is a fully open mobile application platform that enables IT departments to secure, manage and control mobile applications. It is a Mobile App Server that can be deployed on-premises or in the cloud, and its open and extensible design allows users to easily and rapidly develop, deploy and manage multiple mobile applications. Akula integrates with enterprise infrastructure, extending SOA to mobile devices. This structure enables development teams to create a user experience using the front-end tools and frameworks of their choice. In 2013, Verivo announced the release of Akula 1.0.1, which extends the enterprise mobile app platform to Adobe PhoneGap.

== See also ==
- Mobile enterprise application platform
- Mobile application development
- Mobile security
