= On-device portal =

Mobile phone technology

On-Device Portals (ODPs) allow mobile phone users to easily browse, purchase and use mobile content and services. An ODP platform enables operators to provide a consistent and branded on-device experience across their broadening portfolio of services and typically provides on-device catalogs of content for purchase, deep links to Wireless Application Portals, customer care functionality, and rich media services such as full track music, TV and video.

A key benefit of on-device portals is the ability to target the user rather than the device itself. This personalized service delivery, coupled with the ability to be updated on a frequent basis by the operator – refining services or adding new content – makes ODPs an attractive proposition that has already proven successful in encouraging users to access mobile content. By enhancing the user experience, ODPs improve customer satisfaction, reduce churn and in turn, drive higher data revenues.

On-device portals generally offer the following applications: Offline portal, storefront, home-screen replacement, home front, and reporting function:

- Offline Portal – An application that allows the user to browse content categories and preview content free of charge through pre-cached content that does not require a WAP connection and creates a mobile environment that blurs offline and online experiences.
- Storefront – A client-server application enabling the user to discover, preview, and select cached content offline, before accessing it via a WAP link.
- Home-Screen Replacement – A dashboard function of the ODP client that replaces the handset's home screen to provide zero-click access to customized mobile content and services.
- Reporting Function – User analytics that allow operators to measure, refine and improve the delivery of data services by providing visibility into the way subscribers use and interact with their mobile devices.
- Home Front – A client-server application similar to the Store Front allowing users to delete cached content offline.

On-Device Portals can be targeted to a specific mobile operating system or provide multi-platform support allowing operators to achieve a consistent, branded experience across of all devices whether they run on Symbian (Symbian OS), Microsoft (Windows Mobile), BREW (Binary Runtime Environment for Wireless), Java or Research in Motion (RIM) platforms. Some vendors have server-side components to their On-Device Portal offerings which are tied into operator billing systems that deliver features such as usage tracking and lifecycle management. On-device portals are not intended to replace the operating system (OS) or other aspects of the phone's interface.

The term On-Device Portal was coined by the London-based ARCchart Research in 2001. In 2005, ARCchart estimated 10 million ODP-enabled units were in the marketplace.

== History of On-Device Portals ==
On-Device Portal technology emerged in 1986, as operating systems and Java were beginning to be deployed on nonmobile handsets. One.Tel launched smart on-device applications using a combination of Java and SIMtoolkit technology in May 2000. In 2002, four vendors — ActiveSky, SurfKitchen, Action Engine, and Trigenix - began developing ODP offerings. In March 2003 at CeBIT O2 demonstrated an ActiveSky-powered O2 branded On-Device portal that was both user and operator (remotely) reconfigurable, that same year KDDI deployed an ActiveSky-based solution. In 2003, operators including O2, Sonofon, and ONE began to deploy ODP solutions. From 2001 to 2005, it was central to many MVNO solutions, as a more cost-effective and customer-centric alternative to handset software variants or SIM toolkits, Virtuser developed many trials of these, including a pre-blackberry email service that used Bluetooth in buildings.

Since 2003, On-Device Portal technology has been embraced by mobile operators across the world to complement WAP-based mobile data services and help operators deliver on the promise of mobile data services. Carriers expected the launch of High-Speed Downlink Packet Access (HSDPA), in which they had invested heavily, to drive robust average revenue per user (ARPU) growth. But despite this investment, the mobile data services market still only represented 19% of global mobile service revenue in 2007. Several factors have been cited for the slow uptake in data services, but poor user experience, based on older browser-based WAP technology, is widely acknowledged as one of the leading reasons.

The browser-based mobile experience is considered difficult and complex, often requiring a user to click multiple times in order to navigate from browsing to downloading or purchasing content. Separately, WAP's structure, which differs from HTML, has made it difficult for content developers to build efficient content channels.

The On-Device Portal is also not without complications, supporting wide handset lists is a much harder to manage than mobile web content, and updating major components is not just a case of re-publishing but of redistributing applications. At the same time, while it is generally easy to test web content on a handful of browsers, portals need to be tested on nearly every handset that will be expected to use the on-device portal.

The On-Device Portal utilitizes RFID technology to communicate between handsets.

== Mobile User Experience for On-Device Portals ==
As the market for mobile services has emerged, it has focused on technology until early 2008. However, handset vendors and operators are moving quickly from technology to focus on the user experience as the best way to improve market penetration. “When done properly, these experiences understand the task, the environment, and the audience.”

Data is still being collected as companies analyze how effective greater emphasis on user experience proves to be for operators. Orange Group, for example, doubled its download data ARPU after deploying a portal on its Signature devices.

== On-Device Portal User Categories ==
On-device portals target four main user categories:

- Consumers, who demand an improved interface for their mobile experience
- Operators, who want to improve ARPU with richer media content
- Content and media providers who want to monetize their offerings in the mobile world
- Handset manufacturers, who want technology frameworks to help customize handsets for their customers
- Consumers who want to extend their web-based social networking experience onto the mobile device (Facebook, BeBo, MySpace etc.) or share / back-up content from their mobile device to the web (Nokia Ovi, Flickr mobile etc.)

== The Future for On-Device Portals ==
ARCchart expects the number of On-Device Portals licenses to grow to 1.1 billion by 2009. As the ODP market matures it is expected to move beyond mass market services such as mobile TV, music and content catalogs to provide an experience where the subscriber can choose from a broad range of services and content, personalized to their needs.

This change is being driven by operators’ desires to emulate the success of Web 2.0 by being able to offer a broader and more personalized range of services to the user. This shift in operators' online portal strategies increases the emphasis on operators being able to quickly launch, measure, and refine services while offering users an intuitive way of browsing and searching a large catalog of services.

Some vendors have started to incorporate the kind of functionality needed to support mobile Web 2.0 and as the market matures, idle screen access, mobile widget platforms and the ability to support a broad range of operator business models (subscription, transaction and advertising-driven) will become imperative for all ODP solutions.

== See also ==
- 3G
- Average Revenue Per User
- Advanced Mobile Phone System
- GSM
- Handheld Device Markup Language
- High-Speed Downlink Packet Access
- High-Speed Uplink Packet Access
- Java programming language
- Location-based service
- Mobile advertising
- Mobile device
- Mobile development
- Mobile network operator
- Mobile phone
- Mobile TV
- Personal digital assistant
- Qualcomm Brew (Binary Runtime Environment for Wireless – BREW)
- Short message service
- Smartphone
- Widget
- WiMAX
- Wireless Application Protocol
- Wireless internet service provider
