= MoSync =

- Developers: MoSync AB (formerly Mobile Sorcery, now bankrupt)
- Stable release: 3.3.1 / May 30, 2013; 12 years ago
- Repository: github.com/MoSync/MoSync
- Written in: C, C++, Java, JavaScript, C#
- Available in: English
- Type: Mobile Development
- License: Apache License 2.0
- Website: mosync.com

MoSync is a discontinued free and open-source software development kit (SDK) for mobile applications. It is integrated with the Eclipse development environment. The framework produces native mobile applications for multiple platforms using C/C++, HTML5 scripting and any combination thereof. The target group for MoSync are both web developers looking to enter the mobile space, as well as the ordinary PC/Mac desktop developer with knowledge in C/C++ development.

== History ==
MoSync was developed by the Swedish software company MoSync AB (formerly Mobile Sorcery AB). The first version of the product was launched in early 2005 with support for the Java ME platform. Support for several other mobile app development platforms has been added since. MoSync AB filed for bankruptcy in July 2013.

MoSync applications are written in the C and C++ programming languages, or in combination with HTML5 and JavaScript. From this code base, MoSync can build application packages for hundreds of different mobile devices on a wide range of mobile operating systems. MoSync currently supports versions of Android 2.x-4.x, iOS, Windows Mobile Classic, Windows Phone, Symbian S60, Java Mobile and the Moblin platform.

Support for iOS, Android and Moblin was announced on 19th Feb 2010 during Mobile World Congress 2010 in Barcelona.

== Native UI ==
The MoSync platform can access parts of the native UI system on Android and iOS devices since version 2.5, and Windows Phone devices since version 3.0. The MoSync NativeUI API has widgets for embedding webpages and OpenGL ES views in applications and all the UI widgets are handled from the same code base on both Android and iOS. It is also possible to run emulators from other SDKs, such as Android and iOS emulators ensuring that elements native to each OS has the right look ´n feel in their respective environments.

== Wormhole technology ==
Introduced in MoSync SDK 2.7 Pyramid is a technology called Wormhole, which creates a hook which connects javascript calls to MoSync's underlying C APIs, thereby allowing the developer to the functionality of the webview. Currently this functionality is available for Android, Windows Phone, and iOS, while other platforms could be added in future versions, due to the cross-platform nature of the MoSync SDK.
