= MoSync AB =

- Company type: Privately Held
- Industry: Software
- Founded: 2004; 22 years ago in Stockholm, Sweden
- Headquarters: Stockholm, Sweden
- Key people: Tomas Uppgård, CEO; Henrik von Schoultz, Head of Marketing; Antony Hartley, CTO; Alex Jonsson, Head of Services
- Products: MoSync
- Number of employees: 15

MoSync develops systems to develop mobile applications over a broad range of devices and platforms.

MoSync was founded in late 2004 by an international team of mobile entrepreneurs.

The company is located in Stockholm, Sweden and has representation in Singapore. MoSync is privately held.

== Products ==
- MoSync

== Financial information ==
MoSync first raised fund from STING Capital in 2006. In 2009 the company recently raised an early-stage investment round, mostly from MySQL founders David Axmark and Michael Widenius.
