= Mobile workflow =

Mobile Workflows within mobile technology are specialized workflows. The purpose is to address deployment of workflows in mobile device infrastructure, thus enabling automation of process interaction for traditional business processes from within the device.
