= Syclo =

Mobile enterprise application platform

Syclo, LLC
- Type: privately held company (LLC)
- Industry: computer software
- Founded: 1995
- Headquarters: Hoffman Estates, Illinois (additional offices in Chicago, London, and Stuttgart, Germany)
- Key people: Richard Padula, CEO; Jeffrey Kleban, EVP, Alliances & Partnerships
- Products: Agentry Mobile Platform; Syclo SMART Mobile Suite
- Number of employees: 100+
- Website: www.syclo.com

Syclo, LLC (acquired and currently a part of SAP SE), was a mobile enterprise application platform (MEAP) and software provider based in the Chicago suburb of Hoffman Estates, Illinois, offering mobile applications to extend enterprise systems, including packaged software for enterprise resource planning (ERP), enterprise asset management (EAM), and customer relationship management (CRM), to handhelds, smartphones, and mobile computers for technicians and staff performing work away from a central office.

The company's focus in the mobile middleware market is on business environments across industries, including utilities, oil and gas, and life sciences, that utilize field service management processes and typically have significantly valued hard assets to service and protect.

Syclo offers the Agentry mobile platform, an extensible framework based on fourth-generation programming language for developing, deploying, and managing a wireless business application architecture. Agentry also includes mobile device management capabilities embedded into its application platform. Syclo's SMART Mobile Suite of workflow-specific products, a software suite built on the Agentry platform, has been implemented by more than 750 customers in 35 countries and 20 different industries.

On 10 April 2012, SAP announced its plan to acquire 100% of Syclo equity in a deal whose Financial terms were not disclosed. The transaction is expected to be finalized in the second quarter of 2012.

== History ==
After his consulting company, Competitive Advantage Systems, developed a computer-based Wireless order system for Sprint Nextel field workers, Richard Padula started Syclo in 1995 in Barrington, Illinois. Syclo's flagship Agentry mobile development platform was introduced a year later, and in 1998 Rush University Medical Center, Chicago's largest healthcare facility, was the first organization to deploy Syclo's SMART Mobile Suite.

== Acquisition by SAP ==
Syclo was acquired by SAP in 2012.
