= OutSystems =

Software company

OutSystems- Software em Rede, S.A.
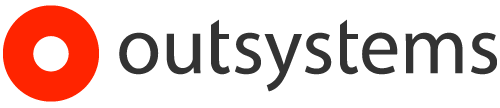
- Type: Private
- Industry: Enterprise Software; Platform as a Service; Digital Transformation
- Founded: 2001
- Headquarters: Boston, Massachusetts, USA
- Key people: Woodson Martin, CEO; Fay Sien Goon, CFO; Carlos Alves, COO; Tiago Azevedo, CIO; Kris Lande, Chief Marketing Officer; June Duchesne, General Counsel; Mark Quigley, Chief People Officer; Kim Seabrook, Chief Revenue Officer; Mariana Quintanilha, Chief of Staff
- Products: OutSystems platform
- Revenue: ▲$100 Million (2018)
- Website: www.outsystems.com

OutSystems is an AI development platform designed for building, deploying, and managing AI apps and agents to accelerate enterprise development.

Founded in 2001 in Lisbon, Portugal, OutSystems later established headquarters in Boston, Massachusetts.

== History ==
OutSystems was founded in 2001 by Paulo Rosado in Lisbon, Portugal.

In 2018, the company raised $360 million in a funding round involving KKR and Goldman Sachs. The company reported generating $100 million in revenue (at the time of its 2018 reporting).

In 2021, OutSystems raised $150 million at a reported $9.5 billion valuation in a round led by Abdiel Capital and Tiger Global.

In 2025, OutSystems appointed Woodson Martin as CEO, with founder Paulo Rosado transitioning to chairman.

== Products and technology ==
=== AI development platform ===
OutSystems an enterprise-proven AI development platform. It provides one platform to manage AI apps and agents across the full development lifecycle. It has been rated highly in customer satisfaction

=== OutSystems Developer Cloud (ODC) ===
In 2021, OutSystems announced a cloud-based development platform known as “Project Neo,” made available for public preview ahead of a planned 2022 launch. The platform uses a container- and Kubernetes-based architecture.

In 2022, OutSystems Developer Cloud (ODC) was described as a cloud-native platform aimed at supporting large-scale application delivery and omnichannel experiences.

=== AI and agentic capabilities ===
==== Mentor ====
Mentor (introduced in October 2024) is an AI-powered digital assistant intended to support software development lifecycle activities, combining low-code development with generative AI and AI-driven guidance. OutSystems Mentor is part of the ODC.

==== Agent Workbench ====
In 2025, OutSystems announced the general availability of Agent Workbench, designed for building and managing enterprise AI agents and agentic systems.

== Acquisitions ==
In 2022, OutSystems acquired Ionic, the company behind the Ionic framework and related mobile development tools. The acquisition was described as expanding OutSystems’ capabilities related to mobile app development and cross-platform delivery.

== Security and compliance ==
In 2026, OutSystems announced it had achieved FedRAMP Authorization, positioning the platform for use cases requiring U.S. federal security compliance.

== Recognition ==
OutSystems has been included in G2’s 2026 Best Software Awards lists, including ranking #11 on G2’s “Best Development Software Products” list.
