= RhoMobile Suite =

RhoMobile
- Stable release: 7.4.2 / December 7, 2021
- Preview release: 7.5.0.beta2 / April 20, 2022
- Written in: HTML5, CSS3, JavaScript
- Operating system: iOS, Android, Windows Phone, Windows 10 Mobile, Windows CE, Windows Mobile, Windows NT, Sailfish OS, Linux
- Available in: English
- Type: mobile development framework
- License: MIT License
- Website: tau-platform.com/en/products/rhomobile/

RhoMobile Suite, based on the Rhodes open source framework, is a set of development tools for creating data-centric, cross-platform, native mobile consumer and enterprise applications. It allows developers to build native mobile apps using web technologies, such as CSS3, HTML5, JavaScript and Ruby. Developers can deploy RhoMobile Suite to write an app once and run it on the most-used operating systems, including iOS, Android, Windows Phone, Windows Mobile, Windows CE, Windows 10 Mobile and Windows Desktop. Developers control how apps behave on different devices. RhoMobile Suite consists of a set of tools for building, testing, debugging, integrating, deploying and managing consumer and enterprise apps. It consists of the products Rhodes, RhoElements, RhoStudio, RhoConnect, and RhoGallery, and includes a built-in Model View Controller pattern, an Object Relational Mapper for data intensive apps, integrated data synchronization, and a broad API set. These mobile development services are offered in the cloud and include hosted build, synchronization and application management.

RhoMobile was part of Zebra Technologies following the October 2014 acquisition of Motorola Solutions by Zebra until 2016 when the project was open sourced.

RhoMobile source code is maintained by Tau Technologies, an independent software vendor founded by RhoMobile team members, who provides RhoMobile related consulting and development services.

== History ==
Formerly known as Rhodes Framework, RhoMobile was founded by Adam Blum in September 2008, along with the creation of the Rhodes project on GitHub. The subsequent months saw releases that added iPhone, Windows Mobile, and Android development support. In May 2009, RhoMobile was a winner at Interop 2009 as the event’s "Best Start Up Company." In November 2009 RhoHub was launched as the beginning of RhoMobile’s hosted, cross-platform development services. In May 2010, RhoMobile was a Web 2.0 Expo LaunchPad winner. Motorola Solutions then acquired the company in October 2011. In 2012, RhoMobile was one of InfoWorld's 2012 Technology of the Year Award winners. In 2013, RhoMobile Suite won the About.com Reader’s Choice Award for being the Best Tool for Cross-Platform Formatting on Apps.

In April 2014, Zebra Technologies acquired Motorola Solutions for $3.45 billion, with the transaction completed in October 2014.

Since 2016 the project is maintained by Tau Technologies.

== Overview ==
=== RhoMobile Suite Products ===
RhoMobile Suite includes Rhodes, RhoElements, RhoStudio, RhoConnect, RhoHub and RhoGallery.

=== Rhodes ===
Rhodes is a free and open source framework and the foundation for the RhoMobile application development platform. It enables developers to use their existing HTML, CSS, JavaScript and Ruby skills to build native apps for all popular operating systems, including iOS, Android, Windows Phone 8. Developers can leverage a large and mature open source community, which has developed thousands of RhoMobile apps.

=== RhoElements ===
RhoElements provides enterprise grade features on top of Rhodes - adding support for enterprise grade Zebra devices including Windows Mobile and Windows CE operating systems. It offers a built-in Model View Controller pattern, an Object Relational Mapper for data intensive apps, integrated data synchronization, and a large API set. The Model View Controller separates an app’s interface from its logic to simplify development and help with control. The Object Relational Mapper offers automatic synchronization of backend data. The broad base of enterprise APIs supports features such as RFID capture, bar code scanning and payment processing. RhoElements features automatic data encryption for data at rest security, protecting information and mitigating risk.

=== RhoStudio ===
RhoStudio is a free Eclipse plug-in, allowing users to develop an application once for deployment on many mobile platforms. Developers can generate, develop, debug and test applications in one place, with no emulators or different hardware needed. Popular OS platforms can be simulated by dropdown box selection. The rationale is that one-time development can mean fewer errors, less hardware costs, and faster deployment.

=== RhoConnect ===
RhoConnect allows developers to build data synchronization into apps for offline data access. It simplifies an enterprise mobile app’s basic backend application integration, enabling users to have their data with them at all times whether or not they connect. It is available on the cloud or on the premises.

=== RhoGallery ===
RhoGallery enables enterprise app distribution, which allows an app store to control and push applications. IT departments are able to deliver applications and updates as needed across multiple operating system and devices.

=== RhoHub ===
RhoHub is the cloud service that comes with a paid subscription and supports cloud builds, RhoConnect hosted service and RhoGallery hosted service.

== Architecture ==
RhoMobile uses a Model-View-Controller pattern. Views are written in HTML (including HTML5). Controllers are written in Ruby.

RhoMobile 7.x and Simplified Pricing Structure

On July 29, 2014, the release of RhoMobile 5.0 was accompanied by a new streamlined service model offering multi-tier transparent pricing, including a free level and two paid subscription levels, Silver and Gold. This new pricing was created to meet the needs of the developer. In this pricing structure, Rhodes, the basic app framework, and RhoStudio are free to use. Both paid levels include Rhodes and RhoStudio as well as RhoElements (enhanced enterprise features such as barcode reading and automatic data encryption), Cloud Build and a Visual Studio plug-in, RhoConnect, RhoGallery and online support. The purchase of a subscription comes with one month of free services.

Since 2015 RhoMobile Suite is distributed with MIT license free to use, with commercial support provided by Tau Technologies. Flexible support options available over request to maintainer company.

== See also ==
- Mobile application development
- Zebra Technologies
