= Appcelerator =

Privately held mobile technology company

- Type: Private
- Industry: Software
- Founded: Atlanta, Georgia (2006)
- Founder: Jeff Haynie and Nolan Wright
- Headquarters: San Jose, California, United States
- Products: Titanium, Appcelerator Platform
- Website: www.appcelerator.com

Appcelerator is a privately held mobile technology company based in San Jose, California. Its main products are Titanium, an open-source software development kit for cross-platform mobile development, and the Appcelerator Platform.

Founded in 2006, Appcelerator serves industries including retail, financial services, healthcare, and government. As of 2014, it raised more than $90 million in venture capital financing.

On February 24, 2021, Axway announced in one of their company blogs that Appcelerator was being discontinued by March 1, 2022 and they would be releasing their Titanium SDK into open-source

== History ==
Jeff Haynie and Nolan Wright met at Vocalocity, an Atlanta-based voice over IP company that Haynie had co-founded. After Haynie sold Vocalocity in 2006, the pair founded Web 2.0 application development company Hakano.

In 2007, Hakano, renamed Appcelerator, began creating an open-source platform for developing rich Internet applications (RIAs). Marc Fleury, the founder of JBoss, joined the company as an advisor.

In 2008, Appcelerator relocated to Mountain View, California, and later released a preview of its Appcelerator Titanium product, which drew comment as a possible open-source competitor to Adobe AIR.

Appcelerator began to focus on mobile apps in 2009. In June, it released a public beta of Titanium, which added support for Android and iOS app development to its existing web and desktop application features. Titanium 1.0 was released in March 2010.

Appcelerator increased its employee count fivefold between October 2010 and 2011. The company's 2011 revenue totaled $3.4 million, a 374 percent increase from 2008.

Between 2011 and 2013, Appcelerator announced acquisitions, including:

- Aptana, integrated development environment (IDE) company
- Particle Code, HTML5 mobile gaming development platform
- Cocoafish, backend as a service
- Nodeable, big data analytics company
- Singly, API management company in August, 2013.

Appcelerator moved to its San Jose headquarters in 2015.

In January 2016, Appcelerator was acquired by Axway, a company that helps enterprises handle data flows.

On 24 February 2021, Axway announced the end of support for the Appcelerator portfolio. According to Axway, new sales ended on 1 March 2021, support for Titanium SDK and several related services ended on 1 March 2022, and Mobile Backend Services ended on 1 September 2022.

As part of that transition, Axway stated that private repositories essential to Titanium SDK would be made publicly available and that control of the open-source project would be transferred to community members. The Titanium SDK project is now maintained by TiDev, Inc. The project's official GitHub repository states that Titanium trademark and patent rights were transferred and assigned to TiDev, Inc. on 7 April 2022.

== Products ==
- Axway Appcelerator Dashboard offers real-time analytics of the lifecycle and success of apps built on the Axway Appcelerator Mobile Solution or directly via native SDK.
- Axway Appcelerator Studio is an open extensible development environment for building, testing and publishing native apps across mobile devices and OSs including iOS, Android.
- Axway API Builder is an opinionated framework for rapidly building APIs with a scalable cloud service for running them. It allows developers to connect, model transform and optimize data for both native or web app clients. API Builder and API Runtime are the backbones of the Axway Appcelerator Platform MBaaS.
- Axway Mobile Analytics is a Mobile Analytics offering that collects and presents information in real time about an application's user acquisition, engagement, and usage.

Titanium

Appcelerator Titanium is an open-source framework that allows the creation of native, hybrid, or mobile web apps across platforms including iOS, Android, Windows Phone from a single JavaScript codebase. As of February 2013, 10 percent of all smartphones worldwide ran Titanium-built apps. As of August in the same year, Titanium had amassed nearly 500,000 developer registrations.

Alloy

Alloy is an Apache-licensed model–view–controller app framework built on top of Titanium that provides a simple model for separating the app user interface, business logic, and data models.

Apps built with Appcelerator products are written in JavaScript. Though initially developed as a Web language, JavaScript is increasingly popular for mobility due to its ability to meet the speed, scale, and user experience requirements that mobile development demands. According to Forrester Research, JavaScript adoption is setting the stage for the "biggest shift in enterprise application development" in more than a decade.

== Funding ==
In December 2008, Appcelerator closed a $4.1 million first venture round led by Storm Ventures and Larry Augustin. Later, in October 2010, the company announced a partnership with PayPal and that it has raised $9 million in Series B funding from investors including Sierra Ventures and eBay.

Appcelerator raised $15 million in Series C funding led by Mayfield Fund, Red Hat, and Translink Capital in November 2011, and a further $12.1 million in a round led by EDBI, the venture fund of the Singaporean government's Economic Development Board, in July 2013.

On August 25, 2014, Appcelerator announced $22 million in Series D funding led by Rembrandt Venture Partners. Total funding for the mobile engagement platform to date is more than $90 million.

== Marketing awards ==
- 2012 The Wall Street Journal: Technology Innovation Award in Software
- 2012 The Wall Street Journal: The Next Big Thing
- 2012 Red Hat Innovation Award Winner: Extensive Partner Ecosystem
- 2012 Momentum Index: 100 Open Source Companies
- 2012 Edison Awards Winner
- 2012 Silicon Valley Business Journal's Best Places to Work in the Bay Area

== See also ==
- Appcelerator Titanium
- Mobile application development
- JavaScript
- Node.js
- Mobile Backend as a service (MBaaS)
- Mobile Enterprise Application Platform (MEAP)
