= LosslessCut =

Free software for video editing

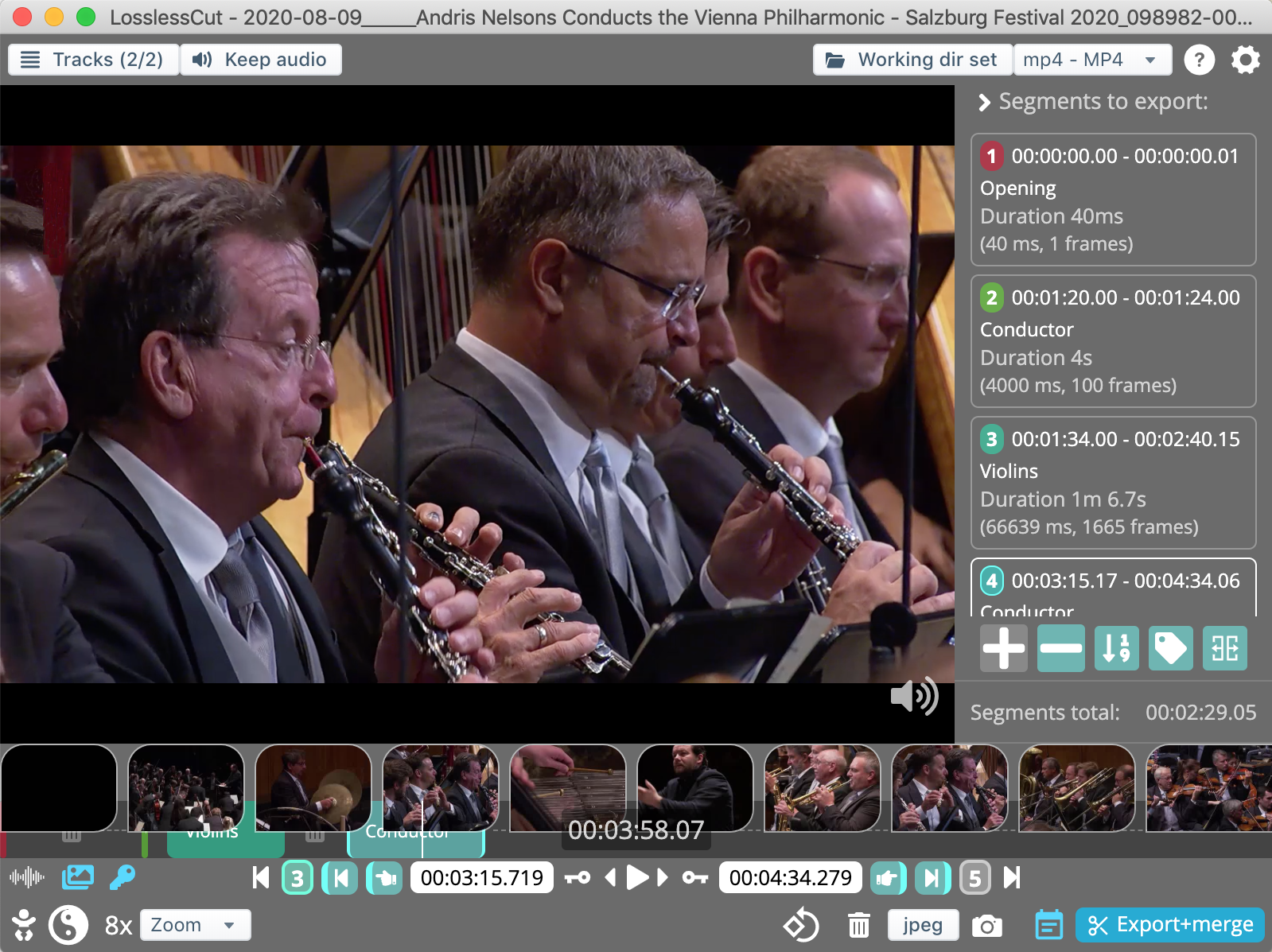
- Screenshot of LosslessCut in macOS
- Developer: Mikael Finstad
- Release: 2016
- Stable release: 3.69.0 / 4 June 2026
- Written in: HTML5, JavaScript
- Operating system: macOS, Linux, Windows
- Available in: English
- License: 2021: GPL-2.0-only (Note: GPL-2.0-only since 2021-08-25.); 2016: MIT (Note: MIT from 2016-10-30 until 2021-08-25.)
- Website: losslesscut.app
- Repository: github.com/mifi/lossless-cut

LosslessCut is a free, platform independent video editing software, which supports numerous audio, video and container formats.

It is a graphical user interface, with macOS, Windows and Linux support, using the FFmpeg multimedia framework. The software focuses on the lossless editing of the video files. By copying the selected image sequences without transcoding or re-rendering, it achieves very fast creation of the target file in comparison to tools that re-encode frames.

Completely lossless copying is achieved when the source file is cut at the reference frames of a group of pictures only. This is being visualised when operating the program.

With a size short of 100 MB, the software is small and portable, thus it can be started from an external storage medium without prior installation. The FFmpeg framework needs to be present on the computer already.

== Core functions ==
Essential functions of the software are:

- Cutting videos and reassembling scenes in selectable order.
- Separation of audio or subtitle tracks from video, or adding of a new track
- Concatenating multiple tracks with the same codec parameters
- Multiplexing into selectable container format
- Saving of single images (snapshots) in JPEG or PNG format
- Adjustment of metadata for rotation or orientation of the video
- Zoomable timeline with annotation of the reference frames and jump functions
- Display of thumbnails of the video and the waveform of the audio track
- Display, name and reorder list of cut segments
- Automatically saving the cut list in CSV format; import and export cut lists
- Display the generated FFmpeg command line for individual adjustments

== Limitations ==
Typically, the segment start will be "rounded to the nearest previous keyframe", thus the author emphasizes that the program is not meant for exact cutting. This limitation is by design to allow the cutting to be lossless, i.e. without re-encoding the frames adjacent to a cut for the codecs using interframe Motion compensation. Though "smart cut", a feature allowing lossless encoding up to the nearest previous keyframe, then encoding the latter part at a cost of small loss, is available experimentally.

The file handling is not fully compliant with operating systems standards, in particular Softpedia reports awkwardness in the input selection window does not filter compatible files, or the output being saved in the same location without prompting.

== See also ==
- Glossary of video terms
- List of video editing software
