= Apache Cordova =

Free software framework for multiplatform hybrid mobile apps

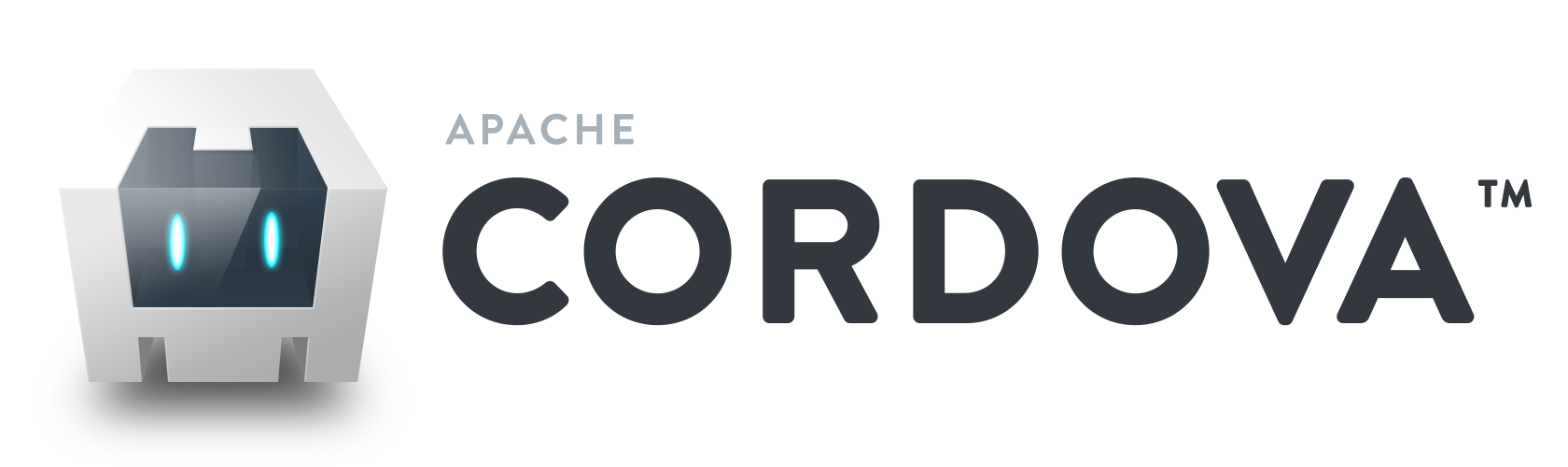
- Original authors: Joe Bowser, Michael Brooks, Rob Ellis, Dave Johnson, Anis Kadri, Brian Leroux, Jesse MacFadyen, Filip Maj, Eric Oesterle, Brock Whitten, Herman Wong, Shazron Abdullah
- Release: 2009; 17 years ago
- Stable release: 13.0.0 / 25 November 2025; 9 months ago
- Written in: C#, C++, CSS, HTML, Java, JavaScript and Objective-C
- Platform: Android iOS, macOS; Windows (8.1, 10, Phone 8.1); Electron
- Type: Mobile development framework
- License: Apache License 2.0
- Website: cordova.apache.org

Apache Cordova (formerly PhoneGap) is a mobile application development framework created by Nitobi. Adobe Systems purchased Nitobi in 2011, rebranded it as PhoneGap, and later released an open-source version of the software called Apache Cordova. Apache Cordova enables developers to build hybrid web applications for mobile devices using CSS3, HTML5, and JavaScript, instead of relying on platform-specific APIs such as those in Android, iOS, or Windows Phone. It enables CSS, HTML, and JavaScript code to be packaged for different mobile platform. It extends the features of HTML and JavaScript to work with the device. The resulting applications are hybrid, meaning that they are neither truly native mobile applications nor purely web-based. They are not native because all layout rendering is done via Web views instead of the platform's native UI framework. They are not Web apps because they are packaged as apps for distribution and have access to native device APIs. Mixing native and hybrid code snippets has been possible since version 1.9.

The software was previously called just "PhoneGap", then "Apache Callback".

PhoneGap was Adobe's commercial version of Cordova along with its associated ecosystem. Many other tools and frameworks are also built on top of Cordova, including Ionic, Monaca, VoltBuilder, TACO, Onsen UI, GapDebug, App Builder, Cocoon, Framework7, Quasar Framework, Evothings Studio, NSB/AppStudio, Mobiscroll, and Telerik Platform. These tools use Cordova, and not PhoneGap for their core tools.

Contributors to the Apache Cordova project include Adobe, BlackBerry, Google, IBM, Intel, Microsoft, Mozilla, and others.

== History ==
PhoneGap was first developed by Nitobi Software at an iPhoneDevCamp event in San Francisco in August 2008. Apple Inc. has confirmed that the framework has its approval, even with the change to clause 3.3.1 of the Apple iPhone SDK developer license agreement 4.0 adopted in 2010. The PhoneGap framework is used by several mobile application platforms such as Monaca, appMobi, Convertigo, ViziApps, and Worklight as the backbone of their mobile client development engine.

Adobe acquired Nitobi Software on October 3, 2011. The PhoneGap code was subsequently contributed to the Apache Software Foundation to start a new project called Apache Cordova. The project's original name when submitted to the Apache Software Foundation, Callback, was changed to Cordova for ease in searching the web. It also appears in Adobe Systems as Adobe PhoneGap and also as Adobe PhoneGap Build.

Early versions of PhoneGap required an Apple computer to create iOS apps and a Windows computer to create Windows Mobile apps. After September 2012, Adobe's PhoneGap Build service allows programmers to upload CSS, HTML, and JavaScript source code to a "cloud compiler" that generates apps for every supported platform. This service was discontinued in 2020.

== Design and rationale ==
The core of an Apache Cordova application uses CSS3 and HTML5 for rendering and JavaScript for logic. HTML5 provides access to underlying hardware such as the accelerometer, camera, and GPS. However, browsers' support for HTML5-based device access is not consistent across mobile browsers, particularly older versions of Android. To overcome these limitations, Apache Cordova embeds the HTML5 code inside a native WebView on the device, using a foreign function interface to access the native resources of it.

Apache Cordova can be extended with native plug-ins, allowing developers to add more functionalities that can be called from JavaScript, making it communicate directly between the native layer and the HTML5 page. These plugins allow access to the device's accelerometer, camera, compass, file system, microphone, and more.

However, the use of Web-based technologies leads some Apache Cordova applications to run slower than native applications with similar functionality.

== Supported platforms ==
As of version 11, Apache Cordova currently supports development for the operating systems Apple iOS, Google Android, Windows 8.1, Windows Phone 8.1, Windows 10 and Electron (software framework) (which in turn runs on Windows, Linux and macOS). Earlier version of Apache Cordova used to support Bada, BlackBerry, Firefox OS, LG webOS, Microsoft Windows Phone (7 and 8), macOS, Nokia Symbian OS, Tizen (SDK 2.x), and Ubuntu Touch.

== See also ==
- List of rich web application frameworks
- List of open-source application frameworks
- Quasar Framework
- RhoMobile Suite
- Cocos2d
- WinJS
- NativeScript
- Xamarin
- Flutter
- Titanium SDK
- Appery.io

== Bibliography ==
- Pelletier, Jeff (April 25, 2013). Mobile App Manual: The Blueprint (1st ed.). Withinsight Publishing. p. 96. ISBN 978-0989072106.
- Shotts, Kerri (February 26, 2013). PhoneGap 2.x Mobile Application Development Hotshot (1st ed.). Packt Publishing. p. 388. ISBN 978-1849519403. Archived from the original on July 1, 2014.
- Gifford, Matt (October 22, 2012). PhoneGap Mobile Application Development Cookbook (1st ed.). Packt Publishing. p. 320. ISBN 978-1849518581. Archived from the original on August 2, 2014.
- M. Wargo, John (June 11, 2012). PhoneGap Essentials: Building Cross-Platform Mobile Apps (1st ed.). Addison-Wesley Professional. p. 384. ISBN 978-0321814296. Archived from the original on April 3, 2015.
- Munro, Jamie (March 29, 2012). 20 Recipes for Programming PhoneGap: Cross-Platform Mobile Development for Android and iPhone (1st ed.). O'Reilly Media. p. 76. ISBN 978-1-4493-1954-0.
- Marinacci, Joshua (March 21, 2012). Building Mobile Applications with Java: Using the Google Web Toolkit and PhoneGap (1st ed.). O'Reilly Media. p. 86. ISBN 978-1-4493-0823-0.
- Lunny, Andrew (September 23, 2011). PhoneGap Beginner's Guide (1st ed.). Packt Publishing. p. 328. ISBN 978-1-84951-536-8. Archived from the original on July 11, 2014.
- Ghatol, Rohit (November 14, 2011). Beginning PhoneGap: Mobile Web Framework for JavaScript and HTML5 (1st ed.). Apress. p. 700. ISBN 978-1-4302-3903-1.
- Myer, Thomas (December 13, 2011). Beginning PhoneGap (1st ed.). Wrox. p. 336. ISBN 978-1-118-15665-0. Archived from the original on June 4, 2015.
