= Mobile enterprise application platform =

Products that enable development of mobile apps

A mobile enterprise application platform (MEAP) is a type of mobile application development platform (MADP) that provides a suite of tools, including frameworks, services, and toolkits, to assist in the development of mobile enterprise applications. MEAP platforms enable organizations and businesses to develop, test, and deploy applications using standardization and protocols.

A MEAP/MADP ideally includes tools for testing, debugging, and maintaining existing applications, as well as API calls for back-end databases and middleware for linting, parsing, and compiling. The term "mobile enterprise application platform" originated from a Gartner Magic Quadrant report in 2008, previously referred to as the "Multichannel Access Gateway Market." Gartner renamed the market to reflect its maturation and the mainstream adoption of mobile tools and platforms.

== Purpose and function ==
MEAPs are designed to address the challenges of developing mobile software across a variety of devices, networks, and user groups throughout the mobile computing technology lifecycle. They are designed to support developers and end users by offering tools for cross-platform development and maintenance.

A key feature of many MEAPs is their cross-platform compatibility. These platforms aim to enable the development of a single mobile application that can be deployed across various devices with different operating systems, such as Android smartphones, iOS devices, tablets, notebooks, or modified handheld gaming consoles.

The primary audience for MEAPs includes organizations developing and deploying multiple applications on a unified infrastructure. This infrastructure can be hosted on-premises (offline), in the cloud (online), or a hybrid environment combining both options. MEAPs also support ongoing maintenance and testing.

Gartner observed that companies utilize the MEAP approach for their platform's needs, incorporating features such as:

1. Support for three or more mobile applications.
2. Support for three or more mobile operating systems (OS).
3. Integration with at least three backend data sources.

== Components and features ==
=== Structure ===
A cloud-based MEAP typically consists of two main components: a mobile middleware server and a mobile client-side application. The middleware server manages system integration, security, communication, scalability, cross-platform support, and other essential functionalities. It does not store data itself; instead, it facilitates the flow of data between backend systems and mobile devices for facilitating communication.

The mobile client-side applications connect to the middleware server, providing both the user interface and the internal logic on the device. These applications are designed to be cross-platform tools that can launch on various mobile operating systems. Mobile apps are generally deployed as "thick" or "native" applications, which are installed directly on the device. Alternatively, they may be implemented as "thin" applications, rendered through browser-based technologies such as HTML5.

=== Features and capabilities ===
MEAP development tools have expanded from traditional 4GL tools to include graphical environments and dedicated scripting languages. To reduce manual coding efforts, many MEAPs include tools that automate or simplify certain aspects of the development process. These may include integrated development environments (IDEs), software development kits (SDKs), low-code development platforms, or no-code development platforms.

MEAPs can integrate with multiple server data sources, enabling businesses to incorporate service-oriented architecture (SOA) services from backend systems. Many MEAPs are cloud-enabled, providing options for deployment and scalability. Centralized mobile application management (MAM) is a common feature to deliver MEAP applications, particularly in business-to-employee (B2E) scenarios.

Some MEAPs incorporate Semantic Web technology to support mobile commerce applications. These platforms utilize semantic integration techniques, applying domain-specific ontologies, and XML-based standards such as OWL and RDF to manage diverse business information resources. Their platform architecture generally includes multiple functional layers, such as a service layer for handling incoming queries and reasoning, a semantic layer for maintaining static knowledge bases, a mapping layer for converting enterprise data into structured formats, and a resource layer that integrates heterogeneous enterprise resources like databases, files, and web services.

Additionally, some MEAPs use inference engines to support resource discovery and aid in decision-making processes.

=== Limitations ===
The accessibility of application development within an MEAP may result in variations in app quality. Reliance on vendor components in each application increases dependency on the vendor for new device support and MEAP maintenance. Additionally, the MAM features typically do not meet the stringent change requirements expected in other corporate functions. Features provided by the MEAP are more limited than those available on the platform, which may fail to meet an organization's requirements. The on-premise installation and MEAP-specific licenses or hardware may involve potentially high costs, depending on the deployment scale and vendor pricing.

== See also ==
- Cross-platform software
- Field service management
- Application server
- Low-code development platforms
- Mobile application development
- Multi-channel app development
