= Meerkats in popular culture =

Meerkats have been subject to numerous cultural depictions, and have featured in television programmes, films, books, and other media.

== Examples ==
- The British television series Meerkat Manor, produced by Oxford Scientific Films, features wild meerkats studied by the staff of the Kalahari Meerkat Project and primarily focused on a group of meerkats called the Whiskers. The show, which aired on Animal Planet, premiered in 2005, and the final episode aired in 2008. The series, which uses narration and traditional nature documentary style footage, has been described as a "reality soap"; the meerkats are given names and described as having human traits — for example, individual meerkats are characterised as being "courageous" or "caring". The 2008 television film Meerkat Manor: The Story Begins detailed the life of Flower, who was the dominant female meerkat of the Whiskers, prior to her becoming the group's leader. Unlike the TV series, the filmmakers did not use actual footage of the Whiskers group. Instead, they primarily used various untrained wild meerkat "actors" to portray those in the story, which was based on the research notes of the Kalahari Meerkat Project.
- The 1987 BBC Wildlife on One documentary Meerkats United, presented by David Attenborough, played a large role in introducing the meerkat species to public consciousness in Britain. It was once voted the best wildlife documentary of all time by BBC viewers. A follow-up, Meerkats Divided, aired in 1996.
- The television advertising campaign Compare the Meerkat is popular in the United Kingdom and Australia. The campaign promotes the price comparison website Compare the Market in the UK, and comparethemarket.com.au in Australia. The campaign was launched in 2009 in the UK, and centers around the anthropomorphic character Aleksandr Orlov (voiced by Simon Greenall), an aristocratic Russian meerkat. Other meerkat characters have featured in the advertisements, such as Aleksandr's sidekick Sergei.
- The Neighbourhood Watch scheme in the United Kingdom has used meerkat imagery in its branding and posters.
- Timon, a character from Disney's The Lion King franchise, is an anthropomorphic meerkat.
- In the book Life of Pi and its film adaptation, the floating island is inhabited by tens of thousands of meerkats, in an environment and grouping unlike real meerkats.
- Billy, the protagonist of the German animated film Animals United, is an anthropomorphic meerkat.
- The 2008 wildlife drama film The Meerkats, produced by BBC Films and The Weinstein Company, uses footage of wild meerkats combined with narration written by Alexander McCall Smith. James Honeyborne directed the film, and is also credited for the story. Paul Newman, in his final film credit, provided the voice of the narrator. Guardian reviewer Philip French commented that the portrayal of the meerkats was "more Disney-anthropomorphic than Attenborough-authentic."
- A rolling version of the popular Linux distribution Ubuntu was called "Maverick Meerkat". It was released in October 2010.
- The Pokémon species Watchog, first introduced in Pokémon Black and White, resembles a meerkat. In official sources, each Pokémon species is given a category describing it; Watchog's category is "Lookout Pokémon".
- Komiya, a character from Sanrio's anime series Aggretsuko, is an anthropomorphic meerkat.
- Meerkats appear in Alvin and the Chipmunks: The Squeakquel. The chipmunk character Theodore is shown to be a fan of the TV series Meerkat Manor; this later influences the plot of the film when, after running away from home, Theodore goes to a zoo and tries to join the family of meerkats there.
- Andre Norton's science fiction book The Beast Master (1959) included a pair of meerkats in the title character's telepathically-linked Commando team. He described their function to another character as, "These were our saboteurs.... They dig with those claws and uncover things other people would like to keep buried. Brought a lot of interesting trophies back to base, too. They're born thieves, drag all sorts of loot to their dens. You can imagine what they did to delicate enemy installations in the field--"
