= List of Meerkat Manor episodes =

Region 2 (Europe) Official Series 1 DVD cover

The episodes of the British documentary Meerkat Manor first premiered on Animal Planet International in the United Kingdom on 12 September 2005. The programme was originally created by Caroline Hawkins, executive producer and series editor at Oxford Scientific Films, and commissioned for Animal Planet International by executive producer and commissioning editor Mark Wild.

The first 13-episode series concluded on 24 October 2005. With the success of the programme in the UK, Animal Planet began broadcasting Meerkat Manor on its national channels in Australia, Canada, and the United States. The programme premiered in the United States on 9 June 2006, with the first series airing through 25 August 2006. The second series aired simultaneously in both the US and the UK, starting 29 September 2006. The third series premiered in the US on 10 August 2007, followed in the UK on 10 September 2007, and in Canada on 3 October 2007. Because each channel had different broadcasting schedules, the UK sequence of new episodes ended well before those in the US and Canada. The fourth series premiered in the United States on 6 June 2008 with the subtitle of The Next Generation. It was originally slated to begin airing in the United Kingdom in February 2009, but the premiere was later moved to April 2009. In 2021, a fifth series with the subtitle Rise of the Dynasty was commissioned by BBC America from Oxford Scientific Films. The 13-part series was shown in the United Kingdom by Channel 5 in December 2021, every weekday in the 6.30pm slot, with the last episode going out on Wednesday 15 December 2021.

The original episodes are narrated by Bill Nighy. The Australian and American channels originally redubbed the episodes using their own narrators. the Australian episodes are narrated by Mike Goldman. In the US, episodes for the first three series were narrated by Sean Astin. For the fourth series, Astin was replaced with Stockard Channing, while BBC America kept Nighy as the narrator of the 2021 series for viewers in the United States. Meerkat Manor is also broadcast in more than 160 countries.

Notable merchandise based on the series include multiple DVD episode sets covering the first three series released in two regions, an upcoming feature film that will be a prequel to the Meerkat Manor series, and a book by Professor Tim Clutton-Brock entitled Meerkat Manor – The Story of Flower of the Kalahari (ISBN 0-297-84484-9).

As the programme originated in the United Kingdom, this article refers to seasons as series. In the case of changes made in the American broadcast, the title it aired under in the US will be listed below the original title, while meerkat name changes will be noted in the episode summary.

== Episode list ==
=== Series 1: 2005 ===
No. overall	No. in series	Title	Original release date	US airdate
1	1	"A Family Affair"	12 September 2005	9 June 2006
Flower, the matriarch of the Whiskers meerkat group, brings her three-week-old pups above ground for the first time. One of Flower's oldest daughters, Tosca, is pregnant. While the Whiskers are out foraging, Flower's teenage pups, led by Kinkajou, grab Mitch and take him from the babysitting burrow to play. When they get bored, they abandon Mitch in the desert, but he is found by his older brother Shakespeare who carries him home. Three days later, the Whiskers are out foraging when they come upon a puff adder in one of their bolt holes. During the futile battle to remove the snake, Shakespeare is bitten on his face and thigh and, unable to keep up with the foraging group, must limp his way home alone.
2	2	"Love Thy Neighbour" "Love Thy Neighbor"	12 September 2005	9 June 2006
Severely weakened Shakespeare is unable to go foraging, so his sister Mozart stays with him to keep him company and act as his protector. Having given birth during the night, Tosca emerges from the burrows late and joins the already foraging Whiskers. Though Tosca makes apologetic gestures and noises, Flower attacks her when she smells the pups on her. Carlos, a roving male from a rival group called the Lazuli, finds the Whiskers' burrow, causing the babysitters to get nervous. One goes and brings back Flower and Zaphod, who quickly chase off the roving male before returning to the foraging group. With the Whiskers to the border between their territories, members of the Lazuli appear and challenge the Whiskers. Though they quickly retreat after the Whiskers take up the challenge, the Lazuli return again with their full group. After a short fight, the Lazuli are forced to retreat again. As the sun sets, Carlos returns to the Whiskers burrow, meeting with Flower's young daughter Daisy and mates with her after being driven off from his first roving attempt.
3	3	"Some Like It Hot"	19 September 2005	16 June 2006
Four days since he was bitten by a snake, Shakespeare is still partially paralyzed and starving from being unable to eat. His sisters Mozart and Tosca continue to watch over him as he goes to forage for food early in the morning. Shakespeare is temporarily separated from his sisters while he's out, but Tosca finds him and they are quickly reunited. Though resources are scarce, Flower allows Tosca's four pups to live, as well as four pups Mozart gave birth to overnight. The next day, after being humiliated by Zaphod, nervous natured Yossarian returns to the burrows and pulls all of Tosca and Mozart's newborn pups out of the burrow to initiate a burrow move. The babysitters and Tosca are confused and begin trampling the pups, and leave them lying under the scorching desert sun.
4	4	"Revolution"	19 September 2005	23 June 2006
Pooky, one of Flower's teenage sons, ends the chaos and leads the other babysitters in moving the pups to the burrow entrance. When Flower and the remaining Whiskers return, Flower quickly moves the pups back below ground. The next day, Flower's four pups go on their first foraging trip. After a few days of being snubbed for his attempted burrow move, Yossarian again drags Mozart and Tosca's helpless pups above ground to initiate a burrow move. This time the babysitters go along with the plan, picking up the pups and following Yossarian's lead. Along the way, they pass the foraging Whiskers. Seeing Flower furiously descending on them, Yossarian drops the pup in his mouth and slinks off. Flower and Zaphod reassert their dominance over the babysitters, then lead the group to a new burrow. However, no one notices the pup Yossarian dropped until they reach the new burrow and Mozart realizes one of her pups is missing. She goes out to search for it, but can't find it and the pup dies.
5	5	"Childhood's End"	26 September 2005	30 June 2006
Flower's pup Mitch attacks one of Mozart's seven-week-old pups. Shakespeare joins the family in a foraging trip for the first time since being bitten by a snake. All of the pups are taken with the family on the day's foraging trip. While the group takes a mid-day break, Flower viciously attacks Mozart and evicts her from the family, forcing her to leave her pups behind. With thunderstorms approaching, the Whiskers take shelter for the night in an empty Lazuli burrow. In the morning, the Whiskers claim the burrow for their own. Hours into the day, the Lazuli appear and attempt to retake the burrow. After a lengthy, ferocious battle, the Lazuli retreat, giving over that part of their territory to the Whiskers.
6	6	"Boys Will Be Boys"	26 September 2005	7 July 2006
Pregnant again, Flower evicts Tosca from the Whiskers and joins Mozart in following the Whiskers and watching their pups from a distance. While out foraging, the Whiskers accidentally cross into the territory of a neighboring meerkat family called the Gattaca, a small group with only a few adults. After some brief war displays, the Whiskers leave, but Yossarian and Big Will stay behind to look for Gattaca females without success. They are eventually run off by the Gattaca males. Mitch eats something that makes him very sick, to the point he can barely move. He manages to drag himself to the burrow for the night. During the night, Mitch recovers while Flower gives birth to a new litter of four pups. After Mozart carefully approaches Flower and makes extensive apologetic gestures, she is allowed to return to the group. Later in the day, Carlos, the wandering Lazuli male who previously impregnated Daisy, approaches the Whiskers den and mates with Mozart.
7	7	"Divided Loyalties"	3 October 2005	14 July 2006
Flower and Zaphod are finding it more difficult to control the now forty strong Whiskers. While the entire group are out foraging, the group begins to split into two. Seven meerkats, including Zaphod and Mozart and two other adults, stay near Flower, while the rest of the Whiskers wander in another direction and end up a mile away at the Whiskers favorite watering hole. The larger group, primarily made of teenagers, doesn't post any sentries and come under attack from Big Si and the Lazuli. Confused, the group flees in a blind panic, going even further from Flower and the others. Flower's group waits at the burrow that night for the others to return, but they do not. The larger "Splinter" group, successfully escaped the Lazuli. Daisy, showing signs of pregnancy, assumes leadership of the group, and Yossarian tries to woo Daisy into accepting him as her dominant male. Tosca finds the Splinter group, but stays at a distance.
8	8	"The Good, The Bad, And The Desperate"	3 October 2005	21 July 2006
Tosca, who was evicted from the Whiskers, reappears and deposes the more timid Daisy as leader of the Splinters. The Whiskers and Splinters are reunited, with Flower resuming her leadership of the group. Flower viciously re-evicts Tosca from the group. Though Daisy is pregnant from her encounter with Carlos, Flower allows her to stay in the group.
9	9	"Daisy's Choice"	10 October 2005	28 July 2006
Daisy gives birth to her new litter of pups, but she gives birth in the wrong burrow. With the rest of the Whiskers in another burrow, Daisy and her pups are alone and in danger. However, Yossarian finds Daisy and helps her carry her pups to the Whiskers burrow. The next day the babysitters initiate another burrow move and Daisy's pups are left behind. Daisy and Mozart stay behind with her pups, but eventually abandon her pups and rejoin their family. Too young to survive on their own, the pups die.
10	10	"Flower Power"	10 October 2005	4 August 2006
Flower has her next litter of pups. When she goes foraging with the group the next day, Tosca's young sons Jogu and McMurphy are left behind as babysitters. Bored and hungry, the two abandon their duty and go off by themselves, leaving the newborns unprotected. Shakespeare returns to the burrow, though, and takes over babysitting. While out foraging, the Whiskers find a burrow containing a litter of Lazuli pups and begin digging them out. A Lazuli male attempts to mate with Flower but is chased off by the Whiskers males. Tosca makes an attempt to rejoin the Whiskers, but is fiercely rebuffed.
11	11	"An Awfully Big Adventure"	17 October 2005	11 August 2006
Now three weeks old, Flower's newest pups are almost old enough to go foraging. One of the pups, Columbus, sneaks away from his babysitters to join the foraging party, spending the day close to Flower. By mid-day, the exhausted pup has to be carried by his brother Shakespeare. As the day ends, the gang returns to the burrow and catches the last rays of sun with his family. The next day an eagle owl threatens the group, requiring them to sneak around it to get back to their home burrow.
12	12	"The Calm Before the Storm"	17 October 2005	18 August 2006
Realizing Flower will never allow her back into the Whiskers, Tosca begins to search for a roving male to start a new group with. The Lazuli come into the Whiskers territory while the Whiskers are out foraging. They find the Whiskers burrow, guarded by lone babysitter Shakespeare. When the Lazuli dominant male Big Si comes into the burrows, Shakespeare puts himself between him and the young pups to protect them.
13	13	"Moving On"	24 October 2005	25 August 2006
The Whiskers return and rout the Lazuli invading their burrows. The pups are alive, however Shakespeare is nowhere to be found. The next day, the group goes foraging, taking the pups. They stumble onto an area with multiple raptors, but Mitch saves the day by leading them into a nearby bolt hole. Yossarian runs into roving male Carlos and chases him off. Carlos runs into the lone Tosca and mates with her. Flower leads the Whiskers to a new burrow. Shakespeare is not seen again, and the narrator notes that he may have died underground in his battle with Big Si.

=== Series 2: 2006 ===
No. overall	No. in series	Title	Original release date	US airdate
14	1	"Cold Comfort"	29 September 2006	29 September 2006
Three months after the end of series 1, it is now late winter in the Kalahari. Neither Shakespeare nor Tosca have been seen by researchers between the filming sessions and both are presumed dead. The Lazuli group has also seen losses over the winter, with the death of their dominant male Big Si, who contracted tuberculosis and was euthanized to avoid an epidemic. His son JD has taken over as the group's temporary dominant male, but as the dominant female, Cazanna, is his mother, he can not mate with her leaving Cazanna on the hunt for a new partner. Whiskers male Yossarian makes his way towards the Lazuli and attempts to mate with Cazanna, but he is chased off by the Lazuli males. Yossarian later runs into and mates with Pancake, who was evicted from the Lazuli by Cazanna. Flower has a new set of pups.
15	2	"The Three Amigos"	29 September 2006	29 September 2006
Flower's newest pups are taken out on their first foraging trip, but the group is attacked by the Lazuli and are temporarily separated. The two groups are reunited on the way home and safely return to the burrow. The Whiskers are unaware that a Cape cobra is sleeping in their burrow, but the night passes without any harm done. Meanwhile, two roving Whiskers males, Mitch and Big Will, join Yossarian in his quest for Lazuli females. All three take aim for Cazanna but are all driven off by the Lazuli males.
16	3	"Young Blood"	6 October 2006	6 October 2006
While out foraging, the Whiskers end up battling a bird for its eggs. While the bird is busy with most of the Whiskers, Einstein, Mitch's brother, manages to grab an egg for himself. A new rival group of meerkats, the Commandoes, appears and spends a night in an unoccupied Whiskers burrow on the edge of their territory. In the morning, the Commandoes, led by Hannibal, their one-eyed dominant male, invades the Lazuli territory. They find the Lazuli burrow and kill one of the two Lazuli pups in the burrow and badly wound Marilyn, the Lazuli babysitter.
17	4	"Iron Lady" "The Iron Lady"	6 October 2006	6 October 2006
Pregnant again, Flower initiates a burrow move and is growing less tolerant of her daughters, Mozart, Daisy and Kinkajou. The Whiskers find some unprotected tortoise eggs and enjoy a rare treat, though the pups struggle to figure out the secret of cracking them open. Despite Flower's short temper, Mozart mates with Stinker, a Lazuli roving male and grandfather of Carlos. Flower attacks her and gives her a warning bite at the base of her tail.
18	5	"There's No Place Like Home" "No Place Like Home"	13 October 2006	13 October 2006
Mozart, now pregnant from her encounter with Stinker, has been evicted from the Whiskers by Flower. She struggles to find food and stay safe on her own while wounded from Flower's attack. Flower steals food from some of the younger Whiskers pups as her time to delivery her newest pups come closer. The rains arrive, ensuring plenty of food for all, and Flower gives birth to five pups.
19	6	"When Flower Met Hannibal"	13 October 2006	13 October 2006
Mozart tries to rejoin the Whiskers while they are out foraging, but her efforts are thwarted by roving male Carlos, who keeps following her around and refusing to leave her alone. With his presence, she can't risk getting too close to the group and retreats. She later tries to sneak into the burrows but is unsuccessful. During a foraging trip, the Whiskers come under attack from a goshawk and are split into two groups. Flower and her pups end up taking shelter in a Commandoes burrow. Mozart miscarries her litter. The Commandoes return to their burrow to find the Whiskers there. They go on the attack and attempt to dig them out and kill the pups.
20	7	"United We Stand"	20 October 2006	20 October 2006
The Whiskers are able to win the battle against the Commandoes when the rest of the Whiskers rejoin Flower and the others. During the battle, one of the Commandoes dies. Mozart is allowed to rejoin the Whiskers. The Whiskers get into a confrontation with a Cape cobra. After three weeks of drought, the heaviest summer rains in decades fall and Flower's five pups make their first appearance above ground.
21	8	"The Enemy Within"	20 October 2006	20 October 2006
Yossarian is left to babysit Flower's pups, but abandons them to look for Lazuli females. Pancake has been allowed to rejoin the Lazuli by Cazanna and gives birth to two pups. The Whiskers discover the Lazuli near their waterhole. The Whiskers chase off the Lazuli, but Flower decides to lead a deep invasion into Lazuli territory to chase them back further. During the battle, many of the Whiskers split off from the main group after they spot Yossarian in the distance and mistake him for a Lazuli male. Flower, having only a few adults with her now, is forced to retreat. After having to wait out a bad storm for a couple of hours, Flower's group safely return homes, while the Splinters spend the night elsewhere. Yossarian, having safely escaped the attacking Whiskers, spends the night alone in the Lazuli territory.
22	9	"The Art of Leadership"	27 October 2006	27 October 2006
With the Lazuli and Whiskers burrows too close for comfort, Flower initiates a burrow move even though the Splinter group hasn't returned yet. The adults carry the pups at first, but after an eagle owl is spotted in a bush, the adults must stay on high alert and the pups are left to run on their own. They safely reach a new den in the evening, but Flower also discovers that her daughter Mozart is pregnant. After a week apart, the Splinter group finds and rejoins the Whiskers.
23	10	"Balance of Power"	27 October 2006	27 October 2006
Flower is pregnant again. The also pregnant Mozart begins overstepping her bounds and attempts to assert her own dominance over the Whiskers, particularly her sister Daisy. In a rare event for meerkat society, Mozart evicts her sister Daisy. Though Flower sees the eviction, she doesn't seem bothered by the actions at first. While out foraging, Flower kills and eats a bird, another rarity for meerkats. Flower lets Daisy rejoin the group and gives Mozart a punishing bite on the tail for her insubordination. While Yossarian is babysitting Flower's pups, her daughter Blossom wanders off but he is able to find her and return her home safely.
24	11	"Growing Pains"	3 November 2006	3 November 2006
The heavy summer rains have turned the Kalahari into a landscape of lush grass and beautiful flowers. The rich grass is too tall for meerkats to see over, so the Whiskers must be extra vigilant while foraging. During the trip, however, Blossom gets too far from the others and can't find her way back. Her brother Mitch comes closer to reaching her, but turns back to the group before he gets within earshot. Without the protection of her family, Blossom is killed by a goshawk.
25	12	"The Godmother"	10 November 2006	10 November 2006
Flower gives birth to three pups. Mozart also gives birth to her own litter of pups. After a few weeks, Flower's pups emerge from the burrow and go foraging with the main Whiskers group. Mozart and her pups, who are too young to forage yet, are left behind at the burrow. At the end of the day, Flower leads the Whiskers to a new burrow, abandoning Mozart and her pups.
26	13	"The Killing Fields" "The Quiet Fields"	10 November 2006	10 November 2006
The lone Mozart struggles to care for her pups at the abandoned burrow. Initially she stays in the burrow to wait for her family returns, but hunger drives her to leave the pups to attempt to find food. The Commandoes, driven by a food shortage, cross into the Whiskers territory to forage. While foraging, they find Mozart's pups alone in the burrow and kill them all. Due to a tawny eagle flying over head, the Whiskers are forced to start foraging late. Daisy is left behind to babysit Flower's pups while the rest go out, unaware that the Commandoes are approaching their position.
27	14	"Meerkat Manor Re-Cap"	TBA	3 August 2007
This special gives a summary of the major events that occurred in Series 2.

=== Series 3: 2007 ===
No. overall	No. in series	Title	Original release date	US airdate
28	1	"On Dangerous Ground"	10 September 2007	10 August 2007
The Whiskers are having to adjust to a hostile new territory after they were evicted by the Commandoes. Flower leads the Whiskers, including her newborn pups, on a dangerous journey to try to find better living grounds. Along the way, they run into their new neighbors, the Zappa. They are able to win the fight relatively easy, however Flower's pups disappear.
29	2	"The Mission"	11 September 2007	17 August 2007
Sophie and Jogu guard Flower's pups as Mitch leaves to find the Whiskers. Flower leads the Whiskers into the Zappa territory to search for the lost pups. The evicted Zappa female Melanie visits the burrow, then leaves followed by Jogu who mates with her. The Zappa find the Whiskers scent marks and follow them towards Sophie and the pups. During his search, Mitch discovers the seven member Starsky group, formed by Mozart, who was evicted from the Whiskers three months ago and is pregnant, former roving Lazuli male Carlos, and Mozart's half sister Kinkajou, who is also pregnant. Sophie tries to call Jogu back, but her calls lead the Zappa to the burrow. Spotting the Zappa, Sophie rushes the pups into the deepest part of the burrow. Before the Zappa reach the burrow, the Whiskers arrive, easily chasing them off. Once again pregnant, Flower decides to make the new burrow their home. Mitch and Jogu safely return before night fall.
30	3	"Something's Got to Give" "Sister Act"	12 September 2007	24 August 2007
As the Starsky goes foraging, Kinkajou leads the group while the heavily pregnant Mozart makes no attempt to assert her dominance. The Zappa make another attempt to raid the Whiskers burrow and take back their territory. Babysitters Columbus and Daisy take the pups inside the burrow as the Zappa arrive and start digging their way towards the pups. The Whiskers return from foraging before the Zappa can get inside the burrow and the outnumbered Zappa quickly turn and flee for their lives. Mozart goes into labor while the Starsky are out foraging, but when she makes lead calls to encourage the group to return to the burrow, they ignore her. When night approaches, Kinkajou leads the group to an abandoned den instead of the burrow. Mozart reluctantly follows into the strange burrow and gives birth during the night. In the morning, the Starsky leave to go, again following Kinkajou's lead. Left alone, Mozart is forced to leave the pups unguarded while she goes to find food. When Kinkajou sees Mozart join the foraging group, she sneaks back to the burrow and kills all of Mozart's newborn pups. Having fed, Mozart returns as quickly as she can, but all she finds of her pups is a partially eaten paw. Kinkajou fully assumes the role of dominate female.
31	4	"The Death of Romance"	13 September 2007	31 August 2007
The Starsky group is looking for a new burrow again. Dominant male, Carlos is suffering from an infection in the bite mark left by Hannibal. Meanwhile, Houdini is roving around the Whiskers, but Zaphod has his guard down since his brother Yossarian had left for an extended roving trip. When Zaphod steals food from Flower, she forages away from him and is found by roving Zappa male Houdini. Houdini managers to mate with Flower before Zaphod spots him and chases him. Before the Starsky reach their new burrow, Carlos dies from his infection (But he really died of TB).
32	5	"Tale of Ren and Stumpy" "Tale of Len and Squiggy"	14 September 2007	7 September 2007
Ren and Stumpy, now three weeks old, venture out of the burrow for the first time. However, Stumpy was born with a deformed front leg. While foraging over a wide area, the Whiskers ends up splitting into two groups. Flower's daughter Rocket Dog leads the group that is with the pups. With resources scarce from a lack of rain, Rocket Dog leads her group on a foraging expedition and to a hopefully new, more promising burrow. Along the way Mitch is the only one of the group to try and care for the two pups and Ren is eventually picked off by a bird of prey. The group arrives at the new burrow without Mitch, who stayed behind in the desert with Stumpy. Eventually Mitch leaves Stumpy behind, who dies from starvation. Meanwhile, Flower has led the rest of the group to a burrow two miles (3 km) away from Rocket Dog's group. Houdini and some Zappa males manage to successfully mate with Maybelline, Daisy, and Rocket Dog. (Note: Although the pups are named Ren and Stumpy, in the US they were renamed Len and Squiggy, respectively.)
33	6	"The House of Zappa" "Sibling Rivalry"	17 September 2007	14 September 2007
After getting bitten by a puff adder, Zappa dominant female Lola gets separated from the group for two days. Finally making her way back to her burrow, her sister Punk takes advantage of Lola's weakened state and takes over as dominant female after anal marking Lola. Houdini returns from his roving mission at Rocket Dog's Whisker Group and Frank is unhappy with the welcome his family gives him. After a short battle for dominance, Houdini chases Frank away and takes over as dominant male. The combination of Punk and Houdini make an ideal leadership pair for the Zappa, but a nightmare for the Whiskers.
34	7	"Heavy the Crown"	18 September 2007	21 September 2007
The food supply of Rocket Dog's group is dwindling, and Flower's group wanders back to their old manor (The one where the Commandoes took over it by driving the Whiskers off their land) in search of food. Instead, they find the familiar trough of water, only to be met by Hannibal and the Commandoes, who are experiencing the same crisis as the Whiskers. In a deadly battle, the Commandoes drive Flower's group from whence they came. Back at the new manor, Rocket Dog's stress of leadership causes herself to give birth to her premature pups above ground, who die. The rains come and flourish the manor, bringing the group back together. Rocket Dog hands leadership back to Flower without a struggle.
35	8	"Journey's End"	19 September 2007	28 September 2007
When the Whiskers fend off an attack from the Zappas, Flower adopts Axel, a pup left behind as the Zappas fled. Returning to the burrow, they chase off a Cape cobra. However, the snake enters the burrow where new pups, born by Flower, have recently been born. Flower goes in to protect the pups and is bitten on the head by the snake. Two days later, she succumbs to the venom and dies, leaving the Whiskers without a leader. And Flower's officially final litter of the whole series emerges from the burrow for the first time.
36	9	"A New Day"	20 September 2007	5 October 2007
After the death of her mother Flower, her eldest daughters battle over who should become the new leader of the family. Eventually, Rocket Dog takes up the role of the new leader of the Whiskers and, with the group numbering 40+ meerkats, the burrow is crowded and crawling with parasites. Rocket Dog initiates a burrow move, but her sister Maybelline chafes under her decision and is unwilling to move her two-week-old pups. When Lyric tries to pick up one of Maybelline's pups to move it, Maybelline strikes out at him. Rocket Dog goes back to try to calm the situation, but without their leader in the front the other Whiskers get confused and the young pups are dropped everywhere. Zaphod, a veteran in burrow moves, picks up a pup and starts moving in the direction Rocket Dog had been taking them. Soon the rest of the group follows, including Maybelline. The next day, the Whiskers run into the Zappa group by the new burrow site and a battle ensues, which the Whiskers win.
37	10	"Farewell My Lovely"	21 September 2007	12 October 2007
6 weeks after the death of his partner Flower, Zaphod leaves the group to become a roving male, but his efforts to find a new mate in the Zappa group are thwarted by dominant male Houdini. The pups come out of the burrow for the first time on their own, and Wilson, a young roving male from the Commandoes is hanging around the Zappa group.
38	11	"Three Degrees of Separation"	24 September 2007	19 October 2007
The newest Whiskers pups go on a foraging trip and learn about life in the Kalahari. At the Starsky burrow, sisters Mozart, Kinkajou and De la Soul (called Whoopi in the US version) are the only members of the group left. They take the risk of going into the Commandoes territory to look for food and possible roving males, but run into the Commandoes group and are chased off. The three get split up during their flight. Mozart and Kinkajou eventually make it back to their burrow, but De la Soul never returns. Mozart and Kinkajou are dangerously underweight and two days after their flight, a storm sends them into a bolt hole to avoid the rain. During the night, Kinkajou dies from malnuration and from being cold. Alone, Mozart attempts to rejoin the Whiskers, but is chased off as an intruder.
39	12	"The Graduate"	25 September 2007	26 October 2007
Wilson, the roving male from the Commandoes, attempts to mate with Rocket Dog at the Whiskers burrow. Zaphod makes a surprising return to the family and resumes most of the duties of the dominant male, including running off rival males. However, Wilson runs into the lone Mozart at the Starsky burrow and gets a better reception. Wilson stays the night at Mozart's burrow and they survive a small bush fire together. Wilson and Mozart make their way back to the Commandoes territory upon sun up. The Whiskers get too close to the Commandoes territory, and another clash ensues with the Commandoes running off the Whiskers. Wilson and Mozart are separated during this fight, so Wilson returns to his group's burrow for the night. In the morning, he rushes back over to Mozart's burrow to find her dead from a presumed jackal attack. Mozart's death occurred about a month after the death of her mother Flower. The ending of the episode said "The land that nurtured Mozart from the first moments of her life, now holds her in a final embrace.".
40	13	"A Family at War"	26 September 2007	2 November 2007
The Whiskers group is now fifty members strong. New matriarch Rocket Dog is having troubles keeping things together while dealing with an increasingly rebellious Maybelline. Maybelline, determined to be a dominant female, breaks free from the Whiskers and takes some others in the group with her. This permanently splinters the Whiskers and Maybelline's new group is given the name Aztecs after Maybelline leads her group into Zappa territory and defeat them once and for all, driving them out off their territory; forever. Maybelline may now be thought of to be her mother Flower's successor instead of Rocket Dog.

=== Series 4: 2008 ===
No. overall	No. in series	Title	Original release date	US airdate
41	1	"To Have and to Have Not"	13 April 2009	6 June 2008
Zaphod, the oldest and most experienced of Whiskers group, has been fitted with a radio collar. During the winter, most of Maybelline's Aztecs left and returned to the Whiskers and the burrowless group sleeps in a bolt hole. Rocket Dog is finding management of the 33 strong Whiskers difficult during the winter as food is in short supply. During their daily foraging trip, Mitch spots a roving male circling the Whiskers. Rocket Dog shows interest in the male as she needs a mate, but Zaphod quickly chases him off, with help from six other Whiskers males. During the chase, however, Zaphod and the others end up far from the rest of the family in unknown territory. The Aztecs are able to safely leave the bolt hole later in the day, and begin searching for a permanent burrow site. The Whiskers head back to their burrow and run into the roving male that Zaphod has chased off earlier, now accompanied by the remaining Commandoes group. Nikita, the dominant female of the Commandoes, leads her group in an attack against the Whiskers. With the loss of seven males, Rocket Dog chooses to flee instead of fight, and the Commandoes drive them completely out of their territory. As the now twenty-five member Whiskers group is forced to sleep in a bolt hole, the Aztecs successfully commandeer a new burrow from a yellow mongoose.
42	2	"All Manor of Love"	14 April 2009	13 June 2008
The seven member Aztecs settle into their new burrow. Wilson, from the Commandos, visits the Aztec burrow and mates with Maybelline. He begins scent marking the territory and other Aztec members to signify he is now the group's dominate male. Zaphod and his group of roving males arrive at the Aztec burrow as well. Zaphod and his group join the Aztecs without any struggle, but it is a futile take over as Maybelline is another of Zaphod's daughters. Zaphod's arrival sends Wilson running, leaving Maybelline without a partner again. Wilson makes his way to the Whiskers group, where he meets with and mates with Sophie, a subordinate female. Zaphod settles with the Aztecs, but the other males who came with him leave, recognizing that they cannot mate with their sisters. Wilson returns to the Whiskers with Sophie, and is quickly chased off by the Whiskers males. Rocket Dog attacks Sophie for mating with a rover.
43	3	"Rising Star"	15 April 2009	20 June 2008
The Whiskers enter the Commandoes territory, but are again badly beaten by their rivals and forced to retreat. Seacrest, one of the Whiskers males, gets separated during the retreat and becomes a rover. He manages to make his way back to the Commandoes burrow and mates with Nikita. Seacrest sleeps above ground near the Commandoes burrow and mates with her again in the morning before Nikita viciously runs him off. Some roving males approach the Whiskers burrow, but the Whiskers males quickly chase them off.
44	4	"The Family Way"	16 April 2009	27 June 2008
The Whiskers are relaxed and playing together, after weeks of strained relationships, as Rocket Dog shows signs of being pregnant. Rover Seacrest joins with the Aztecs, who move to a new burrow as their old one became infested with fleas. While out foraging for caterpillars, Sophie takes a bad fall from a tree and injuries her paw. Led by Rocket Dog, the other Whiskers leave her behind to continue foraging. A roving male comes near the group, and the pregnant Rocket Dog quickly asserts herself as dominant female, scent marking all the females. Sophie is able to walk off her injury and rejoin the family. After submitting to Rocket Dog and being allowed to stay, Sophie meets up with the roving male. The watching Whiskers attacks, chasing off the male. Rocket Dog, joined by Hawkeye, viciously attack Sophie and evict her from the group. The Whiskers, still in search of a home, find the Aztec burrow. The outnumbered Aztecs quickly flee, leaving the Whiskers to claim the newly renovated burrow as their new home.
45	5	"The Mark of Zorro"	17 April 2009	4 July 2008
Exiled Sophie struggles to find food and is plagued with ticks. Axel, her adopted brother, finds her, grooming her and keeping her company until nightfall. Zorro and the other four roving Whiskers males approach the foraging Commandoes but are kept at bay. In the morning, Zorro and his group come at the Commandoes from all sides. The youngest of the rovers, Duke, finds Nikita's sister Rosie and mates with her. After an eagle owl causes both groups to flee to the Commandoes burrow in a panic, Zorro and his brothers take over the group. Zorro and the other rovers scent mark Nikita, with Nikita submitting to their actions, something the announcer notes is an event never seen before in the manor. Zorro is now the dominant male of the Commandoes group, infusing the group with new blood.
46	6	"Great Expectations"	18 April 2009	11 July 2008
Rocket Dog's litter is due in a few days, and Mitch has stepped into the role of dominant male of the Whiskers, though he can not be a mate to his sister. At the Commandoes, Nikita is also pregnant and ten females in her group face potential eviction, particularly her sister Rosie. The Whiskers see a strange meerkat and chase it off, resulting in their finding a new burrow. In the morning, Nikita evicts Rosie with aid from her daughter Serena, followed by one of Nikita's other daughters. The other females make submissive gestures, but Nikita eventually evicts eight of the ten females in her group, reducing the Commandoes group count from twenty to only twelve, and leaving the group with few babysitters for her coming litter. Rocket Dog gives birth to two pups.
47	7	"The Bodyguard"	19 April 2009	18 July 2008
The Whiskers go foraging, leaving one-year-old Axel and Sophie, who has been allowed to rejoin the Whiskers, as babysitters. As the day wears on, Axel struggles to stay awake, eventually falling asleep on the job. When he wakes up, he leaves the burrow to go eat, not realizing that Wilson is approaching the burrow. Wilson enters the burrow in search of Sophie, who was inside with the pups. She follows him outside to do some mutual grooming, leaving the pups alone and unprotected. Axel returns and runs Wilson off, despite Wilson being twice his size. They return to the burrow entrance, and are later joined by the pups on their first excursion outside. Wilson returns, with another adult male. Axel goes after the second male, while Wilson rejoins Sophie. The Whiskers return home and the two Commandoes rovers flee. Mitch goes after Wilson to teach him a lesson. Axel finds a puff adder in a side entrance to the baby sitting burrow. They attempt to chase it off, but it sends the snake further into the burrow as it has no other way out. Sophie is able to lead one of the pups safely out another entrance. When the other pup does not emerge, Rocket Dog runs into the burrow, followed by Sophie. They find him and he is safely brought out of the burrow. Limping from his battle with Mitch, Wilson once again approaches the burrow and Sophie follows again.
48	8	"Divided We Fall (Note: "Divided We Fall" is the first Meerkat Manor episode to be split into two sub-episodes, "The Pup's Story" and "Rocket Dog's Story" which initially cover the same time period before coming to the same conclusion at the end. For simplicity, this episode summary tells the whole story in a linear fashion.)"	20 April 2009	25 July 2008
Rocket Dogs two pups, Nugget and Beaker, are the largest sized pups on record to be born in the manor. The twenty-strong Whiskers go out to forage while Sophie and Simon babysit. The two babysitters eventually lead the pups away from the burrow for their first foraging trip. While out foraging, the Whiskers find an old burrow that was once occupied by the Aztecs, sending the Whiskers into a fury of scent marking and on a search for the trespassing group. When they find them, they give chase, inadvertently sending the Aztecs straight for the pups and the babysitters. Sophie, Simon, and the pups are sleeping where they foraged, unaware that the Whiskers had sent the Aztecs their way. Sophie awakens at the sound of an approaching storm and the Aztec's calls. She and Simon lead the pups to a bolt hole, with the Aztecs giving chase. Back at the burrow, the Whiskers discover the pups are missing, but a thunderstorm temporarily keeps them from going back out to search for them. As Sophie fights to keep the Aztecs from entering the bolt hole, Simon confronts a deadly snake sleeping in the back of the hole. In the morning, it's revealed that the rain forced the Aztecs to flee, allowing Sophie and the pups to flee and return to the Whiskers, while Simon was killed by the snake.
49	9	"To The Manor Born"	21 April 2009	1 August 2008
At the Aztecs burrow, Maybelline and her three sisters are all pregnant. The Lazuli group returns and chases the Aztecs from their new burrows, leaving the Aztecs without a home again, and Maybelline no place to give birth. Eventually, Maybelline leads her Aztecs back to their burrow where they successfully fight off the Lazuli to reclaim their home. At the Commandoes, Nikita has given birth. Zorro struggles to keep his place as dominant male due to challenges from his brothers. Three weeks later, Maybelline has given birth, and evicted two of her pregnant sisters. The third was allowed to remain, having lost her pups after being injured in the battle with the Lazuli. Nikita is pregnant again by an unknown male, as Zorro has not mated with her recently.
50	10	"The Birds"	22 April 2009	15 August 2008
The Whiskers initiate a burrow move after their burrow becomes infested with parasites. Rocket Dog is pregnant again, as are all of her subordinate females. Rocket Dog evicts four of them, including Sophie. At the Commandoes burrow, Nikita's pups are eating solid food, but must deal with Zorro's refusal to share and Nikita's stealing any food they do find. Zorro's brother Miles gives too much attention to Nikita, and after scent marking Nikita again, he traps Miles in a bolt hole and attacks him. When the dust settles, the wounded Miles has been evicted, which the announcer notes is the first male eviction in the history of the manor. Acknowledging Zorro's leadership, the researchers fit him with a radio collar. The Whiskers, meanwhile, settle in a new burrow.
51	11	"The Rovers Return"	23 April 2009	22 August 2008
Rover Wilson attempts to return to his family, the Commandoes, but Zorro will not allow him to. Instead, Wilson joins with Phillipe, a fellow rover. At the Whiskers burrow, evicted pregnant sister Sophie continues to linger near her family. Wilson and Phillipe arrive and attempt to take over of the group, but quickly backed off when confronted by the Mitch and the other males. Sophie and Wilson mate again, while Phillipe provides a distraction by leaving. They spent the afternoon together at a bolt near the Whiskers group. As night falls, Sophie attempts to sneak back into the burrow as she has done each night before, but Wiley Kat chases her off and she must spend the night alone again. In the morning, Rocket Dog evicts Wiley Kat, whose pups are now due. Wiley Kat joins her sister Sophie for companionship. That night, she gives birth but the pups are all stillborn. Wilson and Phillipe find the Aztecs, where Zaphod not only acts as dominant male, helping the group retain its small territory, but also acts as babysitter. Realizing Zaphod is aging, Wilson and Phillipe make a move on the group, but Wilson lets Phillipe distract him while he attempts to woo Maybelline. However, she has no interest in mating or taking on a dominant male. So the duo return again to the Whiskers, where Wilson and Sophie again reunite. Together with Phillipe and Wiley Kat, they have the tenuous foundation for a new group.
52	12	"Home Alone"	24 April 2009	22 August 2008
With only nine members, mostly youngsters, the Whiskers are at their weakest in the group's history. Rocket Dog has only allowed Rita, an adolescent female too young to survive on her own, to stay. Rocket Dog gives birth to four pups, then, driven by hunger, goes to forage along with the other Whiskers. Babysitter Rita follows her instincts and kills the pups. She later gives birth to a single pup, Juno, which is largely ignored by the Whiskers and Rita. After a week together, Sophie and Wiley Kat have been abandoned by Wilson and the Phillipe and return to the Whiskers burrow. Three weeks later, Juno is old enough to explore outside the burrow under the watchful eye of babysitter Sophie. She and her sister have been allowed to remain in the group. Sophie also gave birth to three pups of her own, now a week old. A large number of vultures gathering near the burrow, the Whiskers must change burrows. Their normal three-week move was delayed by the new births. When the vultures are drawn off to other prey, the group springs into action. With the adults carrying Sophie's pups, they leave the burrow, accidentally leaving the confused Juno behind. Rita hears his distress calls and returns for him, saving him from a circling hawk. The Whiskers find a new burrow and settle in.
53	13	"The Darkest Day"	25 April 2009	22 August 2008
The night after the burrow move, a puff adder enters the Whisker's burrow. In the morning, the Whiskers panic as they quickly evacuate the burrow, bringing Sophie's young pups above ground. Rocket Dog went head-to-head with the snake to protect the pups, leaving her with a nasty bite to the head. Her head swollen, she would remain still to give herself the best chance for survival, but with the pups in danger above ground, she summons the strength to initiate a burrow move. Sophie helps her get the group under control and the pups moved, with Axel coming to her final pup's rescue when the other adults are too confused to do anything. As they move, Mitch spots another group in the distance, and they quickly take to the grass to find a bolt hole for temporary refuge. At the Commandoes, Zorro is nowhere to be seen, Miles tries to rejoin the group. Baker, Mile's littermate, is keeping watch, and the two begin posturing for power. Rocket Dog is unable to go further, so Sophie steps in to take over and leads the others, with her pups, for a new burrow. A short distance away, they run into a mole snake. Axel and the others surround and attack the snake to allow Sophie to get the pups safely past. Mitch, Juno, and two other Whisker adults remain behind to watch over the ailing Rocket Dog. Zorro's collar is found up a tree, all that remains of Flower's son who became leader of the Commandoes; it is thought that a bird of prey caught him. At his former group, Miles and Baker continue to brawl, pulling in the other males. Nikita also joins in, attacking Baker. Sophie finds a new burrow for the Whiskers group, showing the potential to be a new leader for the group. Rocket Dog slowly recovers from the snake bite and staggers to her feet. Slowly she and the others make their way to the new burrow. At the Commandoes, Baker has gotten out of Miles death grip and Nikita has pulled back out of the fight. Three days later, Rocket Dog has recovered from her snake bite, and Sophie's pups are old enough to come out of the burrow to explore.

== Distribution ==
=== Online episodes ===
All episodes aired in the United States have been released for download from iTunes, except for the "Meerkat Manor Re-Cap" special from series 2. Discovery Channel's website also offers documentary videos featurettes about the series, top ten moments from the series, and a memorial sequence for Flower through their online video on demand system.

=== DVD releases ===
In Europe, DVD Region 2, Animal Planet International released the first three series to DVD in the form of four disk series box sets containing all 13 episodes within each series; with the first series set released by Go Entertain on 9 October 2006. For the second series set, released 5 November 2007, Demand Media took over distribution of the series. The company released the third series on 23 June 2008. In addition to the standalone series sets, the company has released an intro disc containing the first three episodes of series one and two special edition box sets: the first containing both the series 1 and 2 sets, and the second containing all three series sets.

In Region 1, which includes the United States and Canada, Animal Planet US began releasing Meerkat Manor to DVD through its on-line store on 30 November 2006. Four season sets have been released, with each set containing all 13 episodes in its respective seasons, and with an optional meerkat stuffed toy. All three seasons were also released together in an "Ultimate Fan" collection. These sets were done in Discovery's usual "burn-to-order" fashion, in which the DVDs are burned to DVD when someone places an order. As such, they were only available on Discovery's online store and through Amazon.com. On 9 October 2007, Discovery began releasing the series in regular DVD season sets, through distributor Genius Products, starting with the first season set. The company has released all four aired seasons of the series, with the final season set being released on 27 January 2009.
