= Next Generation =

Next Generation or Next-Generation may refer to:

== Publications and literature ==
- Next Generation (magazine), video game magazine that was made by the now defunct Imagine Media publishing company
- Next Generation poets (2004), list of young and middle-aged figures from British poetry

== Technology ==
Next generation often means a new state of the art:

- AMD Next Generation Microarchitecture (disambiguation), AMD products
- Next Generation Air Transportation System, the Federal Aviation Administration's massive overhaul of the national airspace system
- Next Generation Internet (disambiguation), various projects intended to drastically increase the speed of the Internet
- Next Generation Networking, emerging computer network architectures and technologies
- Next-generation lithography, lithography technology slated to replace photolithography beyond the 32 nm node
- Next-Generation Secure Computing Base, software architecture designed by Microsoft
- NextGen Healthcare Information Systems, develops software and systems to the healthcare industry
- The Next Generation of Genealogy Sitebuilding (TNG), a genealogy software title
- The upcoming generation of video game consoles at a given time
- Boeing 737 Next Generation, airliner
- REAL/NG, an operating system based on REAL/32 (formerly Multiuser DOS) and Linux from 2001 to 2003

== Television ==
- Degrassi: The Next Generation, Canadian television series
- Meerkat Manor The Next Generation, series 4 of Animal Planet's Meerkat Manor television series
- Roots: The Next Generations, miniseries and a sequel to the phenomenally popular miniseries Roots
- Speed Racer: The Next Generation, American animated television series based on the classic Japanese Speed Racer franchise
- Star Trek: The Next Generation, science fiction television series set in the Star Trek universe created by Gene Roddenberry
- "The Next Generation" (Star Trek: Picard), an episode of the third season of Star Trek: Picard
- Oggy and the Cockroaches: Next Generation

== Music ==
- The Next Generation (album), a 2009 album by Sweetbox
- Next Generation (Gary Burton album)

== See also ==
- Generation Next (disambiguation)
- Nextgen (disambiguation)
- New Generation (disambiguation)
- TNG (disambiguation)
