= The Meerkats =

- Promotional film poster
- Directed by: James Honeyborne
- Written by: Alexander McCall Smith
- Narrated by: Paul Newman
- Cinematography: Barrie Britton; Tony Miller; Mark Payne-Gill
- Edited by: Justin Krish
- Music by: Sarah Class
- Production companies: BBC Films; Yaffle Films; BBC Natural History Unit
- Distributed by: Momentum Pictures
- Release dates: 15 October 2008 (France); 7 August 2009 (United Kingdom)
- Running time: 83 minutes
- Country: United Kingdom
- Language: English

The Meerkats, also known as Meerkats: The Movie, is a feature-length 2008 British wildlife fiction film which anthropomorphises the daily struggles of a clan of meerkats in the Kalahari Desert. It was produced by BBC Films, and filmed by the award-winning BBC Natural History Unit. It is the debut directorial feature of James Honeyborne, previously a producer of natural history programmes for television. The worldwide premiere was held at the Dinard Film Festival, France in October 2008, expanding to a wide release the following week. The film was released in 2009, on 7 August in the UK. The film was dedicated to Paul Newman, the narrator of the film, who died in 2008, shortly before this film was released making it his final film role.

== Plot ==
The documentary follows the coming-of-age of a meerkat named Kolo who is forced to leave his home by a group of meerkats who want more territory. Lost in the African savannah, he tries to reunite with his family, but encounters large, fierce, and deadly creatures.

== Production ==
The Meerkats was announced in November 2006 as BBC Films and The Weinstein Company agreed a co-financing deal for the film, with The Weinstein Company also handling international distribution. The year-long principal photography began on location in the Kalahari Desert, South Africa in the same month. It became the Natural History Unit's first feature-length wildlife fiction based on original material, and followed the successes of Earth (2007) and Deep Blue (2003) which were both companion pieces to the BBC television series Planet Earth and The Blue Planet respectively. The script was written by Alexander McCall Smith, author of many books set in Botswana. Paul Newman provides the narration, which was recorded at a studio near his home shortly before his death. The Meerkats was the final film credit of Newman's long career.

Meerkat Manor: The Story Begins, a second feature-length wildlife film on meerkats, was also released in 2008. It was produced by Animal Planet, Discovery Films and Oxford Scientific Films, the makers of Meerkat Manor, but was not screened in theatres. BBC Films' Joe Oppenheimer, a producer of The Meerkats, has stated that the two films are very different in character (the BBC and Discovery originally planned to collaborate, but couldn't agree on a common ground). James Honeyborne has described The Meerkats as "a stand-alone, blue-chip wildlife film from the ground up. It will be immersive. There will be a huge sense of place on a massive scale. You will really see real wild animals."

== Awards ==
- Winner, Grand Prix Earth, Special Award, Tokyo International Film Festival
- Best of Festival, Wild Talk Africa Film Festival
- Winner, Best Editing, Wild Talk Africa Film Festival
- Winner, Best Sound Design, Wild Talk Africa Film Festival
- Nomination, Best Music, Wild Talk Africa Film Festival
- Nomination, Best Script, Wild Talk Africa Film Festival
- Winner, Best Editing, Jackson Hole Wildlife Film Festival
- Nomination, Best Writing, Jackson Hole Wildlife Film Festival
- Winner, Silver Teton, Jackson Hole Wildlife Film Festival

== Reception ==
Writing in The Guardian, reviewer Philip French noted that the "nature movie made in the Kalahari desert has some good footage but is more Disney-anthropomorphic than Attenborough".

On review aggregator website Rotten Tomatoes, the film holds an approval rating of 73% based on 11 reviews, with an average rating of 6.1/10.
