= New Generation (disambiguation) =

"New Generation" is a 1995 single from the album Dog Man Star by Suede.

New Generation may also refer to:

- New Generation (TV series), a 2021 Chinese television drama
- New Generation (Malayalam film movement)
- New Generation Mobile, Italian mobile phone manufacturer
- New Generation Pictures, visual media production company
- New Generation Software, defunct video game company
- New Generation University College in Ethiopia
- New Generation Wrestling, British professional wrestling promotion
- New Generation Party, political party in Costa Rica
- New Generation Party, a nationalist political party in Romania
- New Generation Movement, an Iraqi Kurdish political party
- Death Note: New Generation, Japanese live-action web miniseries based on manga series Death Note
- Street Fighter III: New Generation, a video game of the Street Fighter series

== See also ==
- "The Choice of a New Generation", a 1984 slogan as part of the Pepsi Generation ad campaign
- New Generation Party (disambiguation)
- Newgen (disambiguation)
- Next Generation (disambiguation)
- New Generation Rollingstock, class of Queensland Rail electric multiple units
- Amityville: A New Generation, 1993 American supernatural horror film
- Care Bears Movie II: A New Generation, 1986 animated musical fantasy film
- New Generation Currency Series
