= Meerkat Manor: The Story Begins =

2008 television film directed by Mike Slee

- Region 1 DVD cover
- Written by: Caroline Hawkins
- Directed by: Chris Barker; Mike Slee
- Narrated by: Whoopi Goldberg
- Music by: Laurent Ferlet
- Country of origin: United States
- Original language: English

Production
- Producers: Caroline Hawkins; Clare Birks; Carole Tomko; Mick Kaczorowski; Mark Wild
- Cinematography: Robin Smith; John Walters
- Editor: Oral Norrie Ottey
- Running time: 75 minutes
- Production companies: The Weinstein Company; Discovery Films; Oxford Scientific Films; Animal Planet

Original release
- Network: Animal Planet
- Release: May 25, 2008

Meerkat Manor: The Story Begins is a 2008 television film created by Discovery Films and Oxford Scientific Films as a prequel to the Animal Planet series Meerkat Manor. A scripted documentary narrated by Whoopi Goldberg, the film details the life of a meerkat named Flower from birth to her becoming the leader of a meerkat group called the Whiskers. The film is based on the research notes of the Kalahari Meerkat Project and primarily uses wild meerkat "actors" to represent those in the story. Shot over two years at the Kuruman River Reserve in Northern Cape, South Africa, the film employed a much larger crew than the series. Some scenes were shot at a wildlife park in the United Kingdom, while others were created using camera tricks and trained film animals.

The 75-minute film premiered at the 2008 Tribeca Film Festival before its television premiere on Animal Planet on May 25, 2008. While it was praised for its cinematography, for maintaining the depth of coverage of the television series, and for its accessibility to newcomers to the series, it was criticized for not offering anything new to fans. The Kalahari Meerkat Project noted that the film was not completely accurate but praised it overall and recommended against analyzing it. Several reviewers praised Goldberg's narration, but the script was criticized as being too simplistic for adult viewers.

== Synopsis ==
The meerkat Flower is born in the Kalahari Desert on March 15, 2000, to Holly, the leader of a meerkat group called the Whiskers. After an attack by a rival group, the Lazuli, the Whiskers are forced to surrender their territory and move to a new home.

A hawk kills Holly when Flower is a year old, and her father abandons the group to find a new mate. Flower's sister Viale becomes the group's matriarch and chooses Youssarian, a roving male from the Lazuli, as her mate. Flower mates with Yossarian's brother, Zaphod, but Viale kills the resulting pups and banishes Flower from the group, allowing her to return later.

During a time of starvation and drought, Viale attempts to lead the group across a road to forage. As she crosses, she is struck and killed by a passing truck. As the Whiskers attempt to adjust to the loss of their leader, a snake approaches the group. Flower steps in to lead an attack to drive it off. In doing so, she becomes the new leader of the group. Zaphod returns to the group to be her mate, while Yossarian steps aside and leaves the group. Flower leads the Whiskers back to their original home, and after a brief battle, the Whiskers reclaim it from the Lazuli. At end of the film, an on-screen note describes Flower's death during the third season of Meerkat Manor and the children she left behind.

== Production ==
Created by Oxford Scientific Films for Discovery Films, Meerkat Manor: The Story Begins is a prequel biography of Flower, the central meerkat of the highly rated documentary series Meerkat Manor. Caroline Hawkins, creator of the series, wrote the script using notes taken by Kalahari Meerkat Project researchers, including head researcher Tim Clutton-Brock. Hawkins notes that Oxford Scientific Films believes the film is the first natural history prequel to be created. The film was directed by Chris Barker and Mike Slee, while Whoopi Goldberg, a known Meerkat Manor fan, provided the narration.

"The television series was specifically shot very low and intimate so you have a one-on-one relationship with the meerkats. We put you in their world immediately and you spend almost all your time at their eye level. But we knew to make a feature film we needed something bigger. We had to bring in bigger toys to expand it. We wanted to give everybody a sense of how big the Kalahari is."

— Mick Kaczorowski, Senior Executive Producer

Meerkat Manor normally films episodes using a crew of only two or three people to avoid disturbing the meerkats; the film was shot over two years at the Kuruman River Reserve, where the Kalahari Meerkat Project that the meerkats are a part of is based, and employed a much larger crew. Breaking from the series' pure documentary format, the film does not include footage of the project meerkats depicted in the story. Instead, wild meerkat "actors" represented Flower and her family; Flower was depicted by approximately eight female meerkats. The camera crew sought out appropriately aged meerkats for each scene, then filmed them until they behaved in ways the script required.

While the majority of the meerkats filmed were partially habituated, the cinematographers had to move carefully to avoid scaring the animals. The crew used radios to keep in contact with one another as they followed the meerkat groups around. Although the park normally prohibits low-flying aircraft, the production crew was given permission to film for three days using a low-flying helicopter. Mounted to its front underside was a new type of camera that was not affected by the shaking of the helicopter. Colour scenes depicting the birth of meerkat pups were obtained by filming captive meerkats at the Cotswold Wildlife Park in the United Kingdom.

Because of the viewer backlash Animal Planet received for allowing meerkats from the Meerkat Manor series to die, the producers of the film debated including the filmed death of a young meerkat who was bitten by a snake. They questioned whether viewers would understand that the meerkats were wild animals and that human interference would disrupt the animals' natural life cycles. In addition, to avoid disrupting the research, crews are only allowed to film within the research area under a strictly enforced agreement not to interfere with the meerkats' lives. The producers ultimately included the scene, but the meerkat's cries for help as it lay dying were edited out. Other meerkat deaths depicted were reenactments. For Viale's death scene, the crew rigged a camera mounted on a platform on the side of a truck. Robin Smith, the film and series main cinematographer, hung partially out of the truck to hold the camera steady, giving the visual impression of a truck bearing down on a meerkat. To provide bird and snake footage, professional handlers were employed, ensuring the meerkats were not deliberately put in danger.

In 2007, the real Flower was killed by a snake bite—before the film and the third series of Meerkat Manor had finished shooting. According to Executive producer Mick Kaczorowski, Flower's death imposed the need for a "bigger" ending to the film than the producers originally planned; Flower's death was addressed and the coda added.

== Distribution ==
The film premiered at the 2008 Tribeca Film Festival on 30 April in the Spotlight section, before airing in the United States on Animal Planet on May 25. Its television premiere was followed by the 30-minute Making of Meerkat Manor: The Story Begins special. The film was screened at the 2008 Festival du film britannique de Dinard in France, as The Meerkats, and at the Wildscreen Festival in Bristol on October 18 and 24, 2008.

It was released to Region 1 DVD in North America on 3 June 2008, with the Making of ... special included as an extra. The DVD also includes another special, The Science of Meerkat Manor, giving viewers a look at how the Kalahari Meerkat Project researchers work with the meerkats. It is scheduled for Region 2 DVD release in the United Kingdom on November 2, 2009.

== Reception ==
In 2009, the film was nominated by the Cinema Audio Society for an award in the "Outstanding Achievement in Sound Mixing for DVD Original Programming" category, losing out to the music documentary If All Goes Wrong. Variety's Ronnie Scheib did not think that Meerkat Manor: The Story Begins offered anything new for viewers of the television series, feeling that it was a "re-edited, re-scored, re-narrated" version of the existing series. While he found Goldberg's narration to be higher quality than in most documentaries of this type, he also felt that it "pales after a while." Scheib praised the film for its cinematography and the depth and quality of coverage of the meerkats, and said their activities "constantly amaze", while noting that the film was a condensed and embellished version of actual events that did not distort the meerkats' story. The Friends of the Kalahari Meerkat Project, a sponsorship for the research group studying the meerkats, thought the film was a "heart-touching tribute to Flower, with amazing meerkat, landscape and wildlife footage". Though the group noted that the film changes some details from the life history reports it was based on, they felt the film should be enjoyed rather than analyzed. Common Sense Media reviewer Emily Ashby felt the film was accessible to fans and newcomers to the series; she praised the story's scope and emotional impact, calling it a "captivating journey" that did not avoid depicting the "harsh facts of life in the wild".
