= NGMA =

NGMA may refer to:

- National Gallery of Modern Art in New Delhi, India, or one of its branches:
  - National Gallery of Modern Art, Bangalore
  - National Gallery of Modern Art, Mumbai
- National Grants Management Association

Or an acronym standing for "Next Generation MicroArchitecture" for CPU:

- Intel "Next Generation Microarchitecture", once a reference to Core microarchitecture
- AMD Next Generation Microarchitecture (disambiguation)
