= Newgen =

Newgen or New Gen or New-gen may refer to:

- NEW-GEN, superhero comic book series
- New Gen Airways, airline based in Thailand
- New Generation Pictures, visual media production company

== See also ==
- Nextgen
- New Generation (disambiguation)
