= Generalist and specialist species =

Species that is able to thrive in a wide variety of environmental conditions

A generalist species is able to thrive in a wide variety of environmental conditions and can make use of a variety of different resources (for example, a heterotroph with a varied diet). A specialist species can thrive only in a narrow range of environmental conditions or has a limited diet. Most organisms do not all fit neatly into either group, however. Some species are highly specialized (the most extreme case being monophagy, eating one specific type of food), others less so, and some can tolerate many different environments. In other words, there is a continuum from highly specialized to broadly generalist species.

== Description ==
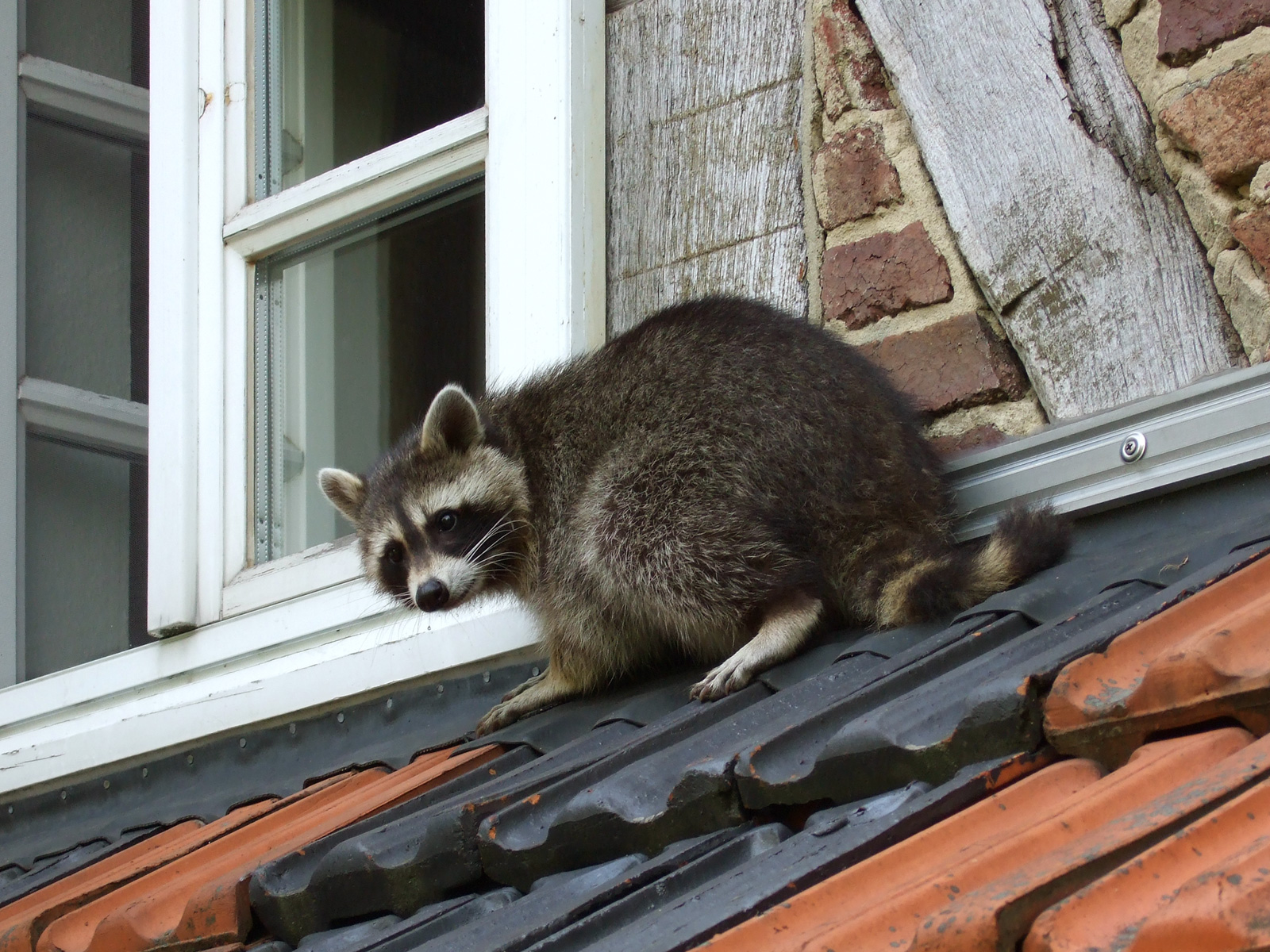
Generalists such as raccoons can sometimes adapt to urban environments and other areas modified by humans, becoming examples of urban wildlife.

Omnivores are usually generalists. Herbivores are often specialists, but those that eat a variety of plants may be considered generalists. A well-known example of a specialist animal is the monophagous koala, which subsists almost entirely on eucalyptus leaves. The raccoon is a generalist, because it has a natural range that includes most of North and Central America, and it is omnivorous, eating berries, insects such as butterflies, eggs, and various small animals.

When it comes to insects, particularly native bees and lepidoptera (butterflies and moths), many are specialist species. It is estimated that about half of native US bee species are pollen specialists, meaning they collect resources from specific genera. For instance, the threatened monarch butterfly exclusively lays its eggs on milkweed species. This reliance underscores the critical role of native plants in supporting ecological food chains.

The distinction between generalists and specialists is not limited to animals. For example, some plants require a narrow range of temperatures, soil conditions and precipitation to survive while others can tolerate a broader range of conditions. A cactus could be considered a specialist species. It will die during winters at high latitudes or if it receives too much water.

When body weight is controlled for, specialist feeders such as insectivores and frugivores have larger home ranges than generalists like some folivores (leaf-eaters), whose food-source is less abundant; they need a bigger area for foraging. An example comes from the research of Tim Clutton-Brock, who found that the black-and-white colobus, a folivore generalist, needs a home range of only 15 ha. On the other hand, the more specialized red colobus monkey has a home range of 70 ha, which it requires to find patchy shoots, flowers and fruit.

When environmental conditions change, generalists are able to adapt, but specialists tend to fall victim to extinction much more easily. For example, if a species of fish were to go extinct, any specialist parasites would also face extinction. On the other hand, a species with a highly specialized ecological niche is more effective at competing with other organisms. For example, a fish and its parasites are in an evolutionary arms race, a form of coevolution, in which the fish constantly develops defenses against the parasite, while the parasite in turn evolves adaptations to cope with the specific defenses of its host. This tends to drive the speciation of more specialized species provided conditions remain relatively stable. This involves niche partitioning as new species are formed, and biodiversity is increased.

A benefit of a specialist species is that because the species has a more clearly defined niche, this reduces competition from other species. On the other hand, generalist species, by their nature, cannot realize as much resources from one niche, but instead find resources from many. Because other species can also be generalists, there is more competition between species, reducing the amount of resources for all generalists in an ecosystem. Specialist herbivores can have morphological differences as compared to generalists that allow them to be more efficient at hunting a certain prey item, or able to eat a plant that generalists would be less tolerant of.

== See also ==
- Cosmopolitan distribution
- Endemism
- Fitness landscape
- List of feeding behaviours
