= Nextgen =

Nextgen, Next Gen, or NextGen may refer to:

== Arts and media ==
- Next Gen (film), a 2018 animated sci-fi action film distributed by Netflix
- Post Human: Nex Gen, an album by British rock band Bring Me the Horizon
- Age of X-Man: NextGen, a 2019 comic book, part of the Age of X-Man crossover

== Companies ==
- NextGen Healthcare, a software company that develops systems for the healthcare industry
- Nextgen Networks, a communication company in Australia
- NexGen, a defunct semiconductor company

== Technology ==
- Next Generation Air Transportation System, the United States Federal Aviation Administration's massive overhaul of the US airspace system
- Next Gen TV, a marketing term for the ATSC 3.0 set of television broadcast standards

== Sports ==
- Juventus Next Gen, reserve football team of Juventus FC
- NextGen series, a European football club cup competition for under-19 footballers
- Next Gen (NASCAR), the seventh-generation stock car used in the NASCAR Cup Series from 2022
- Next Gen Stats, advanced statistics in the National Football League
- LBA Next Gen Cup, a youth basketball tournament
- Next Gen ATP Finals, a professional tennis tournament

== Other uses ==
- NextGen America, an organization focused on climate change, founded by Tom Steyer

== See also ==
- Generation Next (disambiguation)
- Next Generation (disambiguation)
