= List of Meerkat Manor meerkats =

The Whiskers, the stars of Meerkat Manor. Flower, the dominant female for the first three series, is the meerkat wearing a tracking collar around her neck.

The British documentary television programme Meerkat Manor (September 2005 – August 2008), produced by Oxford Scientific Films for Animal Planet International, documented the antics of various meerkats being studied by the Kalahari Meerkat Project. The meerkats live in matriarchal groups led by a dominant couple, who have exclusive mating and breeding rights. The remainder of the group is usually the offspring and relatives of the dominant couple.

In the first three series of the four-series programme, five major groups of meerkats were regularly shown, however, its primary focus was on a group called the Whiskers, one of the largest and oldest of the research groups. Other groups featured were neighbouring rival groups of the Whiskers and groups formed by former Whiskers members. During the first series, a group called the Lazuli were depicted as the Whiskers' main rivals, with occasional appearances by the smaller Gattaca group. In the second series, the Commandoes were introduced as one of the toughest rivals the Whiskers had ever faced, and by the third, the Commandoes had forced the Whiskers to move. The Whiskers then acquired two new neighbouring groups, the Zappa, with whom they had frequent confrontations, and the short-lived Starsky group formed by a trio of evicted Whiskers females. In the fourth and final series, one of the Whiskers' females formed a new group, the Aztecs.

The meerkat families and individuals are listed in order of appearance with the official names and spellings from the original broadcast of the programme used for their primary identification. Differences in the American or Australian broadcasts are noted as necessary, and the information reflects the state of meerkats at the series's end. Meerkats that only appeared in one or two episodes, are unnamed, or otherwise have no significance in the overall programme are not included.

== Whiskers ==
Dominant female: Sophie Whiskers
Dominant male: Squeak Lazuli

The Whiskers are a successful group of meerkats that own a two-square-mile area in the Kuruman River Reserve. The group came into existence in 1998, with four Young Ones females and two Lazuli rovers – reinforced with a wild meerkat who had been released nearby (instead of the potjie) from Van Zylsrus. Holly and Argon took dominance till 2000. After Holly died Risca took dominance with Beetle. She evicted some females who formed the Asphodel and Hobgoblin groups. Eleven Vivian rovers emigrated into Whiskers in 2001. Izit won dominance over Basil, despite Basil being older. Basil left to join to Lazuli. Risca and Izit lost dominance and left to form the Gattaca. Vialli and Zaphod became the next dominant pair. After Vialli died, Flower won dominance in 2002. Yossarian overthrew Zaphod taking male dominance but Zaphod overthrew him sometime after. Flower and Zaphod reign then on. The group split Yossarian and Super Furry Animal taking dominance in the splinter till Baddiel overthrew her sister. The Whiskers reunited and Flower and Zaphod took back dominance. Flower evicted Kinkaju and Mozart with two other females who formed the Starsky. Flower succumbed to a snake bite in January 2007. Her daughter Rocket Dog rose to power after her. The Whiskers split in two and formed the Aztecs. After Rocket Dog died in 2008 and Ella established dominance. Five Whiskers males emigrated into the Lazuli kicking out Thundercat who soon joined the Whiskers. The group recently recovered after a low in numbers. Many Whiskers formed or joined other groups. Some males have joined the Whiskers rivals the Lazuli and Commandos. While many groups were formed by Whiskers members such as the two largest group in the KMP today, the Baobab and Kung Fu. With every move recorded on camera by Cambridge University, the Whiskers became famous as the stars of the hit television series, Meerkat Manor (2005).

When the Whiskers first formed in 1998, their main rivals were Young Ones, Lazuli, Elveera and Vivian. These were their main rivals for three years, then Gattaca formed north of the Whiskers territory and became their rivals. Over the next few years, Vivian moved away from the Whiskers and Commandos became the Whiskers new rivals. Soon Elveera and Lazuli moved away from the Whiskers and Aztecs form their territory next to the Whiskers. In 2007 Whiskers main rivals were Young Ones, Aztecs and Commandos. Then Young Ones died out, and Kung Fu formed next to Whiskers, Commandos moved away and the Sequoia formed. Today Whiskers main rivals are Toyota, Lazuli, Kung Fu and Sequoia.

=== Flower ===
Born 15 March 2000, Flower became the fearless and formidable leader of the Whiskers in 2002. During the course of the series, Flower gave birth to numerous litters of pups, and is believed to have delivered 70 pups over the course of her lifetime. As the dominant female, Flower had the right to kill any pups born to other females in the group, but she did not exercise that right when her daughters, Tosca and Mozart, had pups at the same time early in the first series. Seven weeks after the pups were born, however, she evicted both daughters and forced them to leave their pups behind. (Tosca later died on her own, after Carlos of the Lazuli group had joined up with her for a while.) Flower allowed Mozart back into the group, but evicted her permanently after two more temporary evictions during the first and second series. Twice, Flower initiated burrow moves that would force a female who had given birth to choose between their new pups or their family. Flower's daughter, Daisy, left her pups to die and rejoined her family, while Mozart accepted eviction and being alone to stay with her pups.

Though Flower was known for ruling with an "iron paw", she was a devoted mother, affectionate with her family, and gentle with pups including her daughters'. When her young pups were lost in Zappa territory early in the third series, Flower risked a war with their neighbors to find them. Flower also accepted Axel, an abandoned pup from the rival Zappa group, into the Whiskers clan, where the usual response would have been to kill the young intruder. Flower's four-year reign ended late in the third series when she died after being bitten in the head by a Cape cobra while protecting a litter of newborn pups that were her own.

Flower's death caused a backlash against the Meerkat Manor producers, with fans wondering why the film crew and researchers did not attempt to save the meerkat. The producers and researchers argued that doing so would violate the agreement under which Meerkat Manor was filmed, and that the primary purpose of the Kalahari Meerkat Project is to study "...the breeding success and survival of individuals and ... the factors that effect [sic] reproduction and survival." As such, interfering in the natural processes would render the research results invalid; the purpose of the show is to truly present a realistic view into the meerkats lives including their deaths. After the announcement of Flower's death, the news wire service United Press International released an obituary-like news story, while fans eulogised the late meerkat in letters, poems, memorial videos on YouTube, and numerous postings to fan sites and fan web forums. The US Animal Planet web site added a memorial section to their Meerkat Manor site, offering visitors a copy of Flower's obituary, a video tribute, information about the film, and access to a discussion board and a live chat with the US producer of the series. Animal Planet aired a film biography of Flower's early life on 25 May 2008 entitled Meerkat Manor: The Story Begins. The film, using footage of untamed meerkats and the research notes of Cambridge University, retells the story of how Flower became the dominant female of the Whiskers after the deaths of her mother and sister.

=== Yossarian ===
Zaphod's younger brother, Yossarian, is named after the main character in Catch-22 and has a scar across his left eye. In the third episode of the series, the narrator states that Yossarian was once Flower's mate and the dominant male of the Whiskers, but Zaphod dethroned him before the series started. The Meerkat Manor: The Story Begins film states that Yossarian and Zaphod were once roving Lazuli males. Yossarian became the dominant male of the Whiskers when Flower's sister was the dominant female, and then left the group when Flower assumed the role. Noted as having "some social problems" and being a trouble-maker, Yossarian initiated two burrow moves while babysitting twice in the first series, but both were badly handled. The first attempt resulted in a lot of confusion amongst the babysitters, resulting in the eight newborn pups Yossarian dragged out of the burrow being partially trampled and almost left to die in the desert sun. Pooky, one of the other babysitters, was able to restore order and get the pups to the burrow. A few days later he tried again. This time the babysitters joined him, but as they carried the newborn pups to a new burrow, they passed the main group and Flower and Zaphod ran after them. To avoid Flower's wrath, Yossarian dropped the pup of Mozart that he was carrying and slunk off. The pup died as a result and the rest of the Whiskers temporarily ostracised Yossarian for the havoc wrought by these moves. Yossarian's attempt to help Daisy by carrying her newborn pups to the Whiskers burrow separated him from the family. He also rescued one of Flower's pups in the second series after the young pup had wandered too far from the safety of the burrow.

During the second series, Yossarian began a more concerted effort at finding a mate of his own, and possibly taking over leadership in another group. He made three unsuccessful attempts to reach Cazanna, the dominant female of the Lazuli, after the death of her mate Big Si. Nevertheless, he was able to successfully mate with evicted Lazuli female Pancake. Late in the second series, Yossarian left the Whiskers to become a full-time roving male. He has not appeared since.

=== Shakespeare ===
Shakespeare, named after the famous playwright, was one of Flower's sons. Billed as "courageous" in the opening sequence of series one, he was bitten in the lower jaw and in the thigh by a puff adder in the first episode. He recovered, however, and continued to be a strong contributor to the Whiskers group. Near the end of series one, he was the lone babysitter protecting Flower's most recent pups when the Lazuli group found the burrow, and Shakespeare put himself between the pups and Big Si, the Lazuli's dominant male at the time. When the Whiskers returned and dispatched the Lazuli, the pups were alive but Shakespeare could not be found.

At the start of series two, Shakespeare was still missing and believed dead. Thomas Flower of the Kalahari Meerkat Project explained the lack of certainty by noting that "...meerkats are often killed defending pups, Shakespeare was a babysitter the day before and Lazuli were in the area. However it is equally possible that he was killed by a predator, dispersed to another group, or was killed by another group whilst trying to join them, we just weren't there on that particular day." More recent articles discussing Flower's death refer to Shakespeare's death and reiterate that his body has never been found.

=== Tosca ===
Tosca was one of Flower's oldest daughters, described as "rebellious" in the first series opening sequence. Her name alludes to the famous opera, although the research name, given to her by the Kalahari Meerkat Project researchers, is actually Baddiel. In the first episode, Tosca showed signs of pregnancy. When the pups were born two episodes later, Flower declined to exercise her right to kill them and allowed them to be accepted into the family. Three episodes later, while the pups were only seven weeks old, Flower evicted Tosca from the Whiskers, forcing the new mother to leave her pups behind. When the Whiskers were temporarily split into two groups in the next episode, Tosca found the splinter group and took over leadership from her sister Daisy. Believing the split would be permanent, Tosca was then fitted with a radio collar by the project researchers. However, the two groups reunited, and after Flower resumed her role as dominate female of the group, she permanently and viciously evicted Tosca.

Tosca's attempts to rejoin the Whiskers after the separation from her mother were fiercely rebuffed. Tosca mated with roving male Carlos in the last episode of the first series, but he left her alone and made no motions to work on starting a new group with her. When the show returned for the second series, Tosca was missing. She is believed to have died during the harsh winter.

=== Daisy ===
Daisy is another of Flower's daughters and the first to be impregnated by roving Lazuli male Carlos. When the Whiskers were temporarily split into two groups after a goshawk attack in the middle of the series, Daisy assumed the role of dominant female of the splinter group, but lost the role when her evicted sister Tosca found the group and took control. When the splinter group rejoined the main Whiskers, Flower discovered Daisy's pregnancy but allowed her to remain in the group. Daisy gave birth in an empty burrow, and after Yossarian found her, he helped to carry her newborn pups to the real burrow. The next day, Flower initiated a burrow move. In order to remain with her family, Daisy left the pups behind to die in the abandoned burrow.

In a very rare event in meerkat society, Daisy was evicted from the Whiskers by her sister Mozart late in the second series. After Flower reasserted her dominance over the group, Flower allowed Daisy to return and permanently evicted Mozart. Daisy was the babysitter on duty during both a Commandoes attack on the burrow at the end of the second series, and a Zappa attack early in the third. In both cases, she was able to successfully protect the pups until the remaining Whiskers could return to help. Daisy was impregnated by a roving Zappa male early in the third series, but new dominant female Rocket Dog did not evict her. Daisy successfully gave birth to the litter in the last episode of the series. Daisy's real name was Super Furry Animal. She was played by her two cousins in two episodes.

=== Pookie ===
Pookie is one of Flower's sons and in the first episode of the series when the group went foraging, he, Kinkajou, and Rocket Dog stole Mitch, abandoned him, and looked for something more fun. When Yossarian brought Mozart and Tosca's pup's above ground, he ended the chaos by bringing them back to the burrow entrance. Pookie was Flower's biggest competition for food during her lifetime. She died two days after a bite from a cape cobra on 29 January 2007. She was only 6 years old. After his mom died, Pookie left the whiskers to go out roving. When Pookie tried to steal food from Flower, it taught Columbus a lesson: "Don't mess with Mom".

=== Mitch ===
When the series first started, three-week-old Mitch was taken from the burrow by his teenage siblings as a game, and then abandoned in the desert. His brother Shakespeare found him and safely returned him to the family. Later, he almost died after stealing a poisonous insect from one of the adults and eating it. As he grew into adulthood over the second and third series, Mitch was given the "hero" label once applied to the late Shakespeare. When Mitch was lost in Zappa territory with Sophie, Jogu, and three of Flower's pups, Izzy, Buster and Suggs early in the third series, he attempted to find the Whiskers group on his own so he could lead them back to the pups.

In the middle of the third series, he tried to help Flower's two pups, Ren and Stumpy (Len and Squiggy in the US version), who were being neglected by the temporary Splinters group being led by Rocket Dog. However, Ren was killed by a bird-of-prey, and Mitch was eventually forced to abandon Stumpy and rejoin the family. Late in the series, Mitch found Axel, a pup abandoned during a failed raid attempt by the Zappa, and took him back to the Whiskers where – in an unexpected event within meerkat society – he was adopted into the family. In the fourth season, Mitch continues playing an active role in the Whiskers, assuming the symbolic role of dominant male after the departure of Zaphod and a group of Mitch's older brothers.

=== Rocket Dog ===
Rocket Dog is one of Flower's many daughters and would later become the dominant female of the Whiskers group. When the Whiskers group temporarily split into two groups during a drought and food shortage in the third series, Rocket Dog assumed the leadership of the splinter group. She mated with a roving Zappa male in the middle of the third series, but her pups died in a premature birth caused by the strain of her new-found leadership. When the splinter group was reunited with the Whiskers, Rocket Dog returned to being a subordinate female under her mother without any fuss. After Flower's death near the end of the series, Rocket Dog permanently assumed leadership of the entire Whiskers group, and moved the group to a new burrow. Wilson, a roving male from the Commandoes, attempted to mate with Rocket Dog, but was chased off by Zaphod, Flower's former partner and still dominant male. In the last episode of the third series, Maybelline rebelled against her sister's rule, but Rocket Dog was able to maintain leadership, causing Maybelline to leave the Whiskers and start her own group. In the finale of Season 4, Rocket Dog is bitten by a puff adder. Rocket Dog survives the deadly bite. After filming of the fourth series concluded, and before it aired, several newspapers reported that Rocket Dog was killed while crossing a road on 28 April 2008 and that Animal Planet planned to include a tribute to her at the end of the series. A note was also posted to the Friends of the Kalahari Meerkat website; it was subsequently removed along with all other post season updates, at the request of Animal Planet, but was restored after the fourth series finished airing.

=== Axel ===
Born in the third series, male pup Axel was abandoned by Lola, from the Zappa during one of their unsuccessful attacks on the Whiskers burrow. Mitch found the pup and rather than kill the pup as one would normally expect, he took the pup to his mom Flower. And Flower adopted him into the Whiskers shortly before her death. As he adjusted to his new family, Axel tended to follow Mitch around. Although the narration refers to Axel as a Zappa pup, the research number he was assigned by the Kalahari Meerkat Project indicates that he is actually from the research group the Young Ones, which is often used to film Zappa footage. He is named after the fictional character Axel Foley of the Beverly Hills Cop film series.

=== Sophie ===
Sophie was one of Mozart 's pups seen on Meerkat Manor. She had two brothers and one sister named Sparkle. Only one of her brothers was given a name and he was called Spud. They were born some time after Tosca, Mozart's sister, gave birth to three pups. Their uncle Yossarian decided to move their pups who were only a few days old. He brought each up above ground and started to move them to a new burrow. The babysitters followed him and carried each pup. The Whiskers returned and Yossarian dropped the pup he was carrying, who was Sophie's sister. Her sister got left behind and died later that night. The other pups were moved to the new burrow. One day, while being babysat by Yossarian, Mitch, Sophie's other uncle, viciously attacked her without warning. Yossarian failed to stop the assault and simply waited until Mitch was proud of the beating. Afterwards, little Sophie was in a state of shock, but Tosca gave Sophie a comforting cuddle. Sophie didn't re-appear in the series until much later, when she was older. She was seen babysitting a litter, but was finding them a bit of a handful. That was the last time Sophie was mentioned in Season 1. In this season and up until season 3, she was played by Tina Sparkle since the real Sophie was the one Youssarian unintentionally killed.

Sophie didn't appear in season 2 for the first couple of episodes, the spotlight was mostly on her mother, Mozart, and two older subordinates, Daisy and Kinkaju, as they were the prime evictees of the season. When Sophie was finally mentioned, she was found babysitting Flower's pups with her brother, Spud. The pair were having a very uneventful day, unlike the rest of the family who were caught in a fight for their lives with the Commando family. Sophie and Spud spent their time grooming each other, but were alarmed when a mystery meerkat appeared. They rushed below ground to defend the pups, unaware that the "stranger" was in fact their evicted mother, Mozart. Eventually realizing who it was, Sophie and Spud allowed Mozart to stay at the burrow and even feed Flower's pups. Sophie wasn't mentioned again for the rest of the season.

In season 3, Sophie was mostly only mentioned in the starting episodes of the third season. She was a frequent babysitter, often left with Flower' pups, Buster, Izzy and Suggs, along with Mitch and Jogu. When the Whiskers moved territories, Izzy fell behind and was expected to be killed by an eagle owl, but Sophie rescued the pup. Later, Sophie once again came to Izzy's aid and offered some food. When the babysitters (Sophie, Mitch and Jogu) and the pups were separated from the Whiskers, Mitch, being the oldest, left to find the main group to try and reunite them with the pups. Soon after a Zappa female named Maryline visited the burrow looking for her family. Following his hormones, Jogu went off after the evicted female, leaving Sophie to watch Flower's pups by herself. When the rival gang, the Zappa, attacked, Sophie took the pups below ground. But before the Zappa reached the burrow, the Whiskers arrived and chased them off. After these events, Sophie was seldom mentioned again throughout the season. At one point in the third season, she was played by Finn because Tina Sparkle was evicted.

Sophie was seen much more in The Next Generation. She was the prime babysitter and target for roving males, particularly Wilson from the Commandos. In an early episode, Sophie climbed a tree in search of caterpillars, but slipped and fell, injuring one of her front paws. The Whiskers moved on, potentially abandoning Sophie, but the injured female managed to limp after them and quickly recovered. Shortly afterwards, Sophie was evicted, for mating with Wilson, by Rocket Dog, who was also pregnant by Wilson. Rocket Dog gave birth to two pups and allowed Sophie to rejoin the group once she aborted her litter. Sophie babysat the two pups, Nugget and Beaker, along with Simon. The babysitters decided to take the pups foraging, but they ran into the Aztecs and headed for bolt hole. Inside, Simon found a puff adder, but the Whiskers' babysitters couldn't escape due to the Aztecs, they were viciously blocking the entrance. Eventually, the rain forced the Aztecs to retreat, but with it being so late, the babysitters couldn't return to the main burrow. The next day, Sophie reunited the pups with the Whiskers, but Simon had died from a snake bite. Later on in the series, Sophie was evicted by pregnant subordinate female, Wiley Kat. But before long, Wiley Kat was also kicked out by Rocket Dog. In spite of what Wiley Kat had done to her, Sophie stayed with her, and the pair were quickly joined by Wilson and Philippe. During their time together the small family encountered a Genet and Sophie mated with Wilson. But the rovers eventually left. After that, Wiley Kat and her unborn litter simply disappeared, but pregnant Sophie managed to rejoin the Whiskers. She gave birth to three pups named Flashman, Pickle and Chips, and spent her time babysitting Juno. When Rocket Dog was bitten by a Cape cobra, Sophie led the Whiskers to a new burrow, where Rocket Dog eventually met up with them and slowly recovered from her bite. In this season, Sophie was played by Flower's daughter Ella because her other counterparts, Tina Sparkle and Finn were evicted. After Rocket Dog's Death, she became the dominant female of the Whiskers and still retains that position today.

== Lazuli ==
Dominant female: Christiana Lazuli

Dominant male: Unknown

The Lazuli Mob are one of the most successful groups of meerkats that inhabit an area of the Kalahari Meerkat Project. The Lazuli are also among the oldest groups, and they are currently the oldest living group. It was formed in 1995 by Avatar females Lazuli, Ziziphus and a wild male Belgarion. The Lazuli were also featured on the documentary of Meerkat Manor. The Lazuli grew very large over the years and many of its members are well known. Lazuli was the first dominant female and the group was named after her. Ziziphus was the second dominant of the Lazuli until her death, then her daughter Cazanna became the long term dominant female. She was joined by a Vivian male named Basil who led dominance for four years. Followed by her daughter Aretha, and then her granddaughter Young. The Lazuli have many ancestors in other groups since some of the members had dispersed to other groups or formed new mobs. The Lazuli are currently one of the most famous groups.

=== Cazanna ===
At the time the Lazuli first appeared in Meerkat Manor, Cazanna was the dominant female of the group. After the death of her partner Big Si between the first and second series, her son JD took over as dominant male. Without a dominant male she could mate with, Yossarian and various other roving males from the Whiskers made valiant attempts to mate with her, but none were successful, due to the diligent protection of her son and the other Lazuli males. Cazanna evicted her daughter Pancake, who was pregnant by Yossarian, but Cazanna allowed her to rejoin the family. After filming for series three concluded, Cazanna died from disease and her daughter assumed the leadership of the group.

=== Big Si ===
First introduced as "the biggest, meanest meerkat in the territory", Big Si was the dominant male of the Lazuli who regularly led the various war parties against the Whiskers. At the end of the first series, Big Si led the attack against a Whiskers burrow where Shakespeare was the sole babysitter on duty. Though the Lazuli were forced to flee before they could kill the pups, the series producers and the project researchers believe Big Si killed Shakespeare during this attack, as Shakespeare was last seen putting himself between Big Si and the pups to protect them. Between the first and second series, Big Si contracted tuberculosis. While the researchers and camera crew normally do not interfere with the lives, or deaths, of the meerkats, they had to euthanise Big Si in order to prevent an outbreak that would have been devastating to both the meerkat populations and the local livestock.

=== Rufus ===
Rufus was born into the Whiskers Mob on 1 February 2007 in a mix litter of eight pups. His litter-mates were Burdock, Rhogan Josh, Amira, Squig, Chiriqui, Etosha and Murray. His mother is unknown, but she must have been either Hawkeye, Petra, Flo, Finn or Ella. His father remains unknown as well. His mother and the other females mated during a group split but the splinter group rejoined a month before he was born. On 25 January 2007 dominant female, and Rufus' grandmother, Flower died from a snake bite. He and his litter-mates survived their first few weeks and started to foraged with the adults. The five males soon joined into the Lazuli Mob. Machu Pichu took male dominance but was ousted by Wollow. Machu Pichu joined Beebop and formed the PK mob along with Rhogan Josh. But Rufus' litter-mate didn't stay in the group and took to roving. Rhogan Josh is now in the Chuckle Bros group. It is a group of roving male who are not attached to any breeding clan. Then Axel left the Lazuli with some males and joined Stop it. Only Wollow and Rufus remained in the Lazuli. Rufus took to roving with some of his new Lazuli pals. He lived in the Lazuli for two years and often roved. In February 2010 when Rufus returned from roving he got in a fight with dominant male Wollow. He managed to overthrow Wollow. Life changed for Rufus who took over as dominant male beside dominant female Young. Rufus evicted Wollow from the group in June 2010 but he allowed the former beaten dominant male to return to the group. Young became pregnant and Rufus is most likely the father. Rufus was sadly predated in September . He was the only one out of his litter to become a dominant meerkat.

=== Young ===
Young was born on 12 March 2005 with her litter-mate sister, HP in the Lazuli. Her mother was Alina and her father was an unknown rover. Alina was the daughter of Cazanna and Basil the former dominant pair of the Lazuli making Young their granddaughter. On 24 April 2006 Young and HP give birth to a mixed litter of pups. The pups were Caroline, Bernard, Teaser, Shaka Zulu, Flax, Landie and Lallie. Cazanna died in early 2007 and Aretha took over dominance. In May 2007 Flax died. In September 2007 Lallie and Teaser died. In November 2007 Landie died. Aretha evicted Mungojerry, Bonzo, Zooey and her sister HP. They were last seen in January 2008 when Tybalt disappeared. On 4 January 2008, Young gave birth to Calvinia, Christiana, Prieska and Lutzputz. When Aretha died in May 2008, Young became dominant female of the Lazuli. In June 2008 five Whiskers males joined the group. The males were Machu Pichu, Wollow, Rhogan Josh, Rufus and Axel. At first Machu Pichu took dominance beside Young and may have fathered her next litter. While he was recovering from a snake bite, he was overthrown by Wollow. In August 2008 J. Alfred Prufrock, Bernard, Shaka Zulu, Bash and Bosh were kicked out of the group and joined wild females to form the Hoppla group. On 25 August 2008 Young and Caroline give birth to Rum, Muck, Eigg and Hen. Machu Picchu and Rhogan Josh left to form the PK. In November 2008 Young give birth to Toppen, Kuhglocken, Snowy, Soul Hudson and Franz. In December 2008 Young give birth to Sammy Jo, Finnlex, Bernie, Chuck Norris, Old Greg, and Rufio. In September 2009, Young and Calvinia give birth. Both Hen and Young gave birth to a mixed litters. In 2010 Wollow was overthrown by Rufus who took male dominance. Young is pregnant in June 2010 but aborted her litter in the same month. Sadly, Young was found dead in March 2013. Her daughter Christiana now leads the group.

== Commandoes ==
Dominant female: Nikita Commandoes

Dominant male: Unknown

The Commandoes Mob was formed in 2004 when a group of Gattaca females teamed up with a Young Ones roving coalition. Aragorn and Zorilla established dominance after several disputes. They remained the dominant pair till 2007 when Aragorn died. After the death of Aragorn, his son Ketamine established natal dominance beside his mother. Then five Whiskers males emigrated and all natal adult males had left, Zarathustra became dominant male till he was predated. Then Baker took his position but Miles stole it from him. Throughout their history, the Commandos had been a fast-growing group, unlike their founding group the Gattaca. In January 2009, Zorilla, Miles, Baker Karim and Cody were killed by TB, the group is led by Whiskers male Panthro and Commandos female Celidh. Disease hit the group killing a few members. The Commandos left the monitored area and could no longer be tracked. A few new groups were formed from Commandos members. The Kung Fu was formed by Zorilla's sister. The Geckos and Sequioa were formed by Zorilla and Aragorn's daughters. Benzedrine is the last known surviving Commandos meerkat today.

In seasons 2 and 3, the Commandoes were played by the Vivian. In Season 4, the real Commandoes played themselves. In the US, the Commandoes were spelled "Commandos" which is also the spelling used for the real mob.

=== Nikita ===
The dominant female of the Commandoes, Nikita is as tough as her partner, and can be just as vicious. During the raid on the Lazuli burrow, Nikita aided in the killing of a Lazuli pup. She led the group in the killing of Mozart's newborn pups in the last episode of the second series, after Mozart had been permanently evicted from the Whiskers. During her first pregnancy in the fourth series, Nikita evicts eight of the ten females from the Commandoes group, most of whom were her own daughters.

At the start of the fourth series, Nikita is shown without a mate after the death of Hannibal. Nikita is impregnated by Seacrest, a Whiskers roving male, in the third episode of the fourth series. In the fourth, she accepts Whiskers rover Zorro as the group’s dominant male, and allows his four brothers to join the group.

=== Hannibal ===
Hannibal, a one-eyed meerkat from the Commandos, was first seen in season 2 of Meerkat Manor. He was the meerkat that most groups feared. The groups he went to war with were: The Whiskers, The Lazuli, The Starsky, and The Zappa. Hannibal was the reason that Carlos, his son, has the scar on his face. His mate was Nikita, the meanest, nastiest mother in the meerkat world. They had created a loyal and ferocious gang of meerkats. Hannibal died in his sleep over a terrible winter. Hannibal had many fans and is dearly missed by them, although not quite as much as Flower.

=== Wilson ===
Wilson (a.k.a. Romeo Wilson), a son of Hannibal and Nikita, is a roving male who attempts to mate with females from various other Meerkat Manor groups throughout the third and fourth series. He visited the Zappa burrows without success, and later tried to mate with new Whiskers dominant female Rocket Dog before Zaphod chased him off. Towards the end of the series, Wilson met Mozart, the last surviving member of the Starsky group. When an approaching brush fire separated them, he went back to her burrow in the morning only to find her dead from a predator attack. However, Wilson had a famous Romeo-Juliet relationship with babysitter, Sophie, and is the likely father of her first litter. Wilson has been documented to go out of his way to visit Sophie while the Whiskers were out foraging.

=== Zorro ===
Zorro is a young Whiskers male who in the first episode of the fourth series left his group, along with four of his brothers and Zaphod, to rove. They initially join the Aztecs with Zaphod, but eventually left again to continue roving. In the fifth episode of the series, they encounter the Commandoes. Nikita and her nearly all-female group initially rebuff the group, but after an eagle owl causes a group panic, Zorro and his brothers are able to use the distraction to initiate a takeover bid. Nikita accepts Zorro's scent marking her and he becomes the Commandoes' new dominant male. Later in the series, when one of Zorro's brothers, Miles, continues attempting to get close to Nikita, Zorro viciously attacks him and exiles him. This is the first known male exile in the manor. To acknowledge Zorro's leadership, he is fitted with a radio collar. Three episodes later, Zorro's collar is found in a tree, and he is believed to be dead, presumed killed by a bird of prey.

== Zappa ==
Dominant female: Punk Zappa
Dominant male: Houdini Zappa

Named after musician Frank Zappa, the Zappa group formed in 2001, but did not appear in Meerkat Manor until the third series when the Whiskers became their new neighbours. Billed in the opening credits as "the neighbors from hell", the fourteen-members-strong Zappa have multiple run-ins with the Whiskers throughout the series. Led by dominant pair Lola and Frank, the Zappa have a quick fight with the Whiskers in the first episode of the third series, but are forced to flee from the much larger group. When the Whiskers invaded the Zappa territory in search of Flower's missing pups, they ended up confiscating a Zappa burrow, claiming the part of the land as their territory. The Zappa repeatedly tried to retake the stolen burrow, but all attempts ended in failure. In the middle of the series, while Lola was recovering from an injury, her sister Punk took over as dominant female. The same day, Frank was disposed by Houdini and forced out of the group. Punk proved to be a greater risk taker than Lola, and again led the Zappa in a futile attack against the Whiskers. After Flower's death, the Zappa tried to commandeer a burrow that the Whiskers had just moved in, but the Zappa were again defeated and chased off.

While there is a group named the "Zappa" within the Kalahari Meerkat Project, the Zappa shown in Meerkat Manor are primarily filmed using footage from a second research group called the Young Ones. However, scenes of the dominant couple are from the real Zappa group, as are the stories told about the group as a whole.

=== Lola ===
Lola, the dominant female of the Zappa at the beginning of the third series, regularly commandeered food from her subordinates. Lola disappeared from the group for two days after being bitten by a puff adder. After she struggled to make her way home, her younger sister Punk took advantage of her weakened state and took over as dominant female. Though Lola recovered from the snake bite, she continued to accept Punk as the new leader. When the Zappa later ran from a confrontation with the Whiskers, Lola left behind a pup she was carrying, Axel, who was adopted by the Whiskers. Zaphod once visited the Zappa burrow and almost mated with Lola, but was chased off by Houdini. Lola was instrumental in defending Punk's newborn pups during an attack by the newly formed Aztec group.

In the sixth episode of the third series, Meerkat Manor indicates that Lola has been the leader of the Zappa for three years. However, the Kalahari Meerkat Project records show that she was born in March 2005. This would make the narration inaccurate, as the third season was filmed between November 2006 through April 2007.

=== Frank ===
Like the Zappa group, Frank was named after Frank Zappa. Frank, an older male, was a formidable leader who showed no fear of leading his much smaller group against the Whiskers massive mob. After Punk took over the group, Houdini returned from a roving trip and challenged Frank for dominance in a vicious fight. Unable to defeat the younger meerkat, Frank was deposed and forced into exile. He has not been seen in the series since.

=== Punk ===
Punk is Lola's littermate, and the current dominant female of the group as of the end of the third series. More aggressive than her sister, Punk grew increasingly rebellious under Lola's leadership. When Lola was weakened by a snake bite, Punk took over as dominant female. Later that day, when Houdini returned to the group and defeated dominant male Frank, Punk quickly accepted him as her new partner.

During the third series, Punk regularly led the Zappa into grab-and-go foraging runs into the Whiskers territory, but the smaller size of the group forced them to flee from direct confrontations. Towards the end of the series, a pregnant Punk started stealing food form her subordinates just as her sister once did. The Zappa came under attack from the newly formed Aztec group in the last episode of the series, but were able to escape. Punk's pups were saved through the efforts of Lola. After the fourth series aired in the United States, the Friends of the Kalahari reported that Punk was killed by a martial eagle in August 2008.

== Starsky ==
The Starsky was a small group of seven meerkats that formed between the filming of the second and third series. The group first appeared in the second episode of the third series. Mozart and Kinkajou, two of three evicted Whiskers sisters in the group, competed for the position of dominant female, while Carlos, the former roving male from the Lazuli, was secure in his position as dominant male. The group struggled to survive from the start. They were plagued with problems, such as Carlos having a fatal face injury, keeping litters alive, and their small territory having little food. After Carlos died from an infection in his wound, the remaining meerkats began dying from starvation, disease, and predation. By the eleventh episode of the third series, only the three sisters, Kinkajou, Mozart, and De la Soul, remained. The last of the group, Mozart, was killed by a jackal in April 2007, bringing the short life of the Starsky group to an end.

=== Mozart ===
A daughter of Flower, Mozart was originally a member of the Whiskers group. She received her name in honor of the famous composer. Referred to as "the caring" one in the first series credits, Mozart was always ready to lend a helping hand for the family. When her littermate Shakespeare was bitten by a puff adder in the first episode, she stayed at his side and kept him company until he recovered. Mozart was temporarily exiled from the Whiskers group several times for having pups. Her first eviction came part way through the first series and lasted only one episode. Her second eviction in the next series was ended by her miscarrying. Near the end of the second series, Mozart again became pregnant, and then made the unusual move of evicting her sister Daisy from the Whiskers. Flower led the Whiskers to a new home and left Mozart alone at the burrows with her newborn pups, effectively evicting her. The Commandoes killed Mozart's pups in the next episode while Mozart was on the search for food.

When Mozart returned in the third series, she competed with her sister Kinkajou, also evicted from the Whiskers, for leadership of a new group, the Starsky, which she had founded with roving male Carlos. Kinkajou eventually took over as dominant female, asserting her dominance by killing Mozart's newborn pups. Carlos' death left the Starsky females without a mate or a potential for new pups, and the remaining members of the group died. Mozart at last lost her sisters in the eleventh episode. Shortly after, Mozart met a roving Commandoes male, Wilson, who seemed primed to help her revive the group, but Mozart was killed outside of her burrow by a jackal the next day.

Mozart's death, having come less than a month after the death of her mother, was reported in national newspapers, including New York Times and The Denver Post. Saddened fans posted various tributes online, including poems, songs, and videos.

=== Carlos ===
Carlos, whose research name was JD, made regular appearances in the series starting with the second episode. A rather amorous fellow who was billed as the Kalahari's "Casanova", he impregnated at least four Whiskers females during the first series including Daisy, Mozart, Tosca, and Kinkajou. Despite his roving ways, the show producers referred to him as Mozart's "long-time love" due to their frequent matings.

In the third series, Carlos put aside his roving ways and became the dominant male of the Starsky, with both Kinkajou and Mozart pregnant with his pups. Carlos was bitten in the face during a fight with Commandoes dominant male, Hannibal. An infection set into the wound, eventually killing Carlos (he really died of TB) and leaving the Starsky without a dominant male.

=== Kinkajou ===
Named after the South American mammal, Kinkajou was the younger half-sister of Mozart and appeared sporadically throughout the programme. In the first series, a teenage Kinkajou took her younger brother Mitch from the burrow and left him alone in the desert after she got bored with watching him. She became a more reliable babysitter as she grew older, but followed in her mother Flower's footsteps with an unauthorised pregnancy in the second series. As Kinkajou was evicted between the second and third series, it remains unanswered how she was reunited with her sisters Mozart and De la Soul.

At the start of the third series, Kinkajou was pregnant by Carlos and determined to become the dominant female of the group. She started her quest for leadership by leading the group on their foraging trips and then initiating a burrow move. As a final assertion of dominance, she demonstrated her right to be the only female in the group with pups by killing Mozart's newborn pups. She held her position as dominant female until the group, down to only the three sisters, had a disastrous run-in with the Commandoes near the end of the series. After fleeing for their lives, only Kinkajou and Mozart remained. They found a burrow for the night during a storm, but weakened from starvation, Kinkajou died in her sleep.

=== De La Soul ===
De La Soul was Mozart and Kinkajou's younger sister. She was a former Whiskers member but was evicted from the group. The date or reason for this is unknown. She did not challenge Kinkajou and Mozart for the role of dominant female of the Starsky. De La Soul, Mozart and Kinkajou were the only three members of the Starsky towards the end of series 3, as the others had died from disease and predation. After a confrontation with the Commandoes, the three sisters were split up, and De La Soul was chased by the Commandoes. Kinkajou and Mozart made it to a burrow but De La Soul did not join them. She was never reunited with Mozart and Kinkajou and has not been seen since. She is thought to have been killed by the Commandoes. She was known as Whoopi in the American version.

== Aztecs ==
Dominant female: Maybelline Whiskers
Dominant male: Needs new dominant male.

The Aztecs are a small group of seven adult meerkats that was formed by Maybelline in the final episode of the third series when she broke away from the Whiskers. In the fourth series, the group is shown to now be a regular rival of the Whiskers. In the second episode, Zaphod and a band of roving males join the Aztecs, with Zaphod becoming the group's new dominant male. Right now, the Aztecs are left without a dominant male, since Zaphod has died.

=== Maybelline ===
Rocket Dog's sister, Maybelline, is one of three Whiskers to be impregnated by roving Zappa males while they are part of a temporary splinter group led by Rocket Dog. Maybelline gave birth just before Flower's death, and as Flower had no litter of her own at the time, the Kalahari Meerkat Project believes it was Maybelline's newborn pups that Flower was protecting when she was killed by a snake. When Rocket Dog initiated a burrow move, Maybelline at first refused to move her young pups but later gave in. When her pups were older, Maybelline rebelled against Rocket Dog's leadership. Unable to depose her sister, Maybelline left the Whiskers with her pups and a couple of adults at the end of the third series to form a new group, the Aztecs.

=== Zaphod ===
Zaphod, named after Zaphod Beeblebrox from The Hitchhiker's Guide to the Galaxy, was Flower's devoted partner and the dominant male of the Whiskers. As Zaphod assumed both roles by usurping, he tended to be edgy if Yossarian got too close to Flower. According to the Meerkat Manor: The Series Begins film, Zaphod was a roving Lazuli male before he joined the Whiskers. He was really born in the Vivian, not the Lazuil. He and his younger brother, Yossarian, visited the Whiskers at the same time in search of females. Flower's sister Viale, then the dominant female, chose Yossarian as her mate and he became the group's dominant male. Zaphod and Flower also mated, but Viale killed the resulting pups. After Viale's death, Flower assumed the role of dominant female and showed preference to Zaphod for her mate. Yossarian then left the group for an unknown length of time.

Being one of the largest meerkats in the group earned him the description of a "bruiser", ready and willing to lead the charge against any Whiskers rivals, or rival males trying to get too close to any of the Whiskers females. After Flower's death in the third series, Zaphod continued to perform the duties as the group's dominant male and would chase off any roving males trying to reach new dominant female Rocket Dog. As meerkats will not mate with first generation relatives, he eventually left the group and became a roving male. He returned after two episodes and still acted as the group's dominant male as of the end of series three. At the start of the fourth series, Zaphod was shown with his own radio collar. He left the Whiskers again to become a rover, then took over as dominant male of the Aztecs in the second episode of the series. As Maybelline was also one of his daughters, Zaphod was still without a mate. On 4 March 2011, Zaphod died of old age. He was 12 years old.

== Minor groups ==
=== Gattaca ===
The Gattaca, named after the 1997 science fiction movie, was a minor group of approximately ten members that appeared briefly in the first series. The small group first appeared in episode seven when the Whiskers accidentally crossed over into their territory. The meeting ended without incident as the Whiskers willingly returned to their own land. Risca, a former dominant female of the Whiskers, led the Gattaca. Acting as minor rivals of the Whiskers, the Gattaca received little story attention until they quietly disappeared from the show before the end of the series. In reality, the group died out from disease and predation.
