= Alan Pottasch =

American advertising executive and marketer

- Born: August 13, 1927; Long Island, United States
- Died: July 27, 2007 (aged 79)
- Occupation: Advertising
- Notable work: "Pepsi Generation" campaign

Alan Maxwell Pottasch (August 13, 1927 – July 27, 2007) was an American advertising executive and marketer best known for his five decades of work for PepsiCo. Specifically, Pottasch is best known as the creator behind the "Pepsi Generation" advertising campaign.

== Early life ==
Alan Pottasch was born on August 13, 1927, on Long Island in New York. He grew up in New York City. Pottasch enlisted and served in the United States Navy during World War II.

Pottasch enrolled at Pennsylvania State University following World War II. He graduated from Penn State in 1949 with a Bachelor of Arts in creative writing. Pottasch went to a directors school and went on to work at a television station in Dallas, Texas, and as a producer-director at ABC-TV.

== Pepsi ==
Alan Pottasch began working for PepsiCo in 1957. The year that Pottasch joined PepsiCo, Coca-Cola outsold Pepsi by a six to one margin in the United States.

Under Pottasch, the "Pepsi Generation" marketing campaign was launched in 1963. Pottasch's "Pepsi Generation" marketing campaign has been called groundbreaking because it focused on the "attributes" of the consumers buying Pepsi's products (sometimes called "selling a way of life"), not just attributes of the product itself, such as price or taste. This was a very uncommon marketing strategy for a company in the early 1960s. The campaign and Pepsi Generation theme was launched and aimed at young Baby Boomers just as they were becoming an important consumer and demographic group. The campaign was a risk for Pepsi. Years later Pottasch said in a podcast posted on Yahoo's "Giants of Advertising" web site, "For us to name and claim a whole generation after our product was a rather courageous thing that we weren't sure would take off."

The risk paid off for both Pottasch and Pepsi. Under Pottasch's campaigns, Pepsi eventually went from behind Coca-Cola, to being on par with Coke in several markets.

Alan Pottasch changed and slightly tweaked Pepsi's slogan to "The Choice of a New Generation" in 1984. The new theme was meant as a break from the past and show that Pepsi had something new to offer consumers, with an emphasis on music. Pottasch developed famous 1980s Pepsi commercials starring Lionel Richie, David Bowie, and Madonna. However, he was most well known for developing a series of award-winning Pepsi commercials starring Michael Jackson. In a famous accident, Jackson's hair caught on fire while filming one of Pottasch's commercials. He once told a Yahoo podcast, "I guess I'm best known for having burned Michael Jackson's hair."

Pottasch eventually produced a large number of Pepsi commercials featuring Michael J. Fox, Ray Charles, Cindy Crawford, Britney Spears and Beyoncé Knowles.

Pottasch officially retired from Pepsi in 1991, but continued to work for the company as a consultant. He eventually returned to PepsiCo full-time. He continued to work for Pepsi up to 2007.

Alan Pottasch died in his sleep on Friday, July 27, 2007, while on location in Los Angeles filming Pepsi's newest Mt. Dew commercial. He was 79 years old. Pottasch was survived by his wife, Lisa Pottasch, his daughter, Allison Pottasch, who lived with him in New Fairfield, Connecticut, son Alan Pottasch Jr, and sister Harriet Selig. A private memorial ceremony was held at PepsiCo's headquarters in Purchase, New York, in September 2007.
