= Generation Next =

Generation Next may refer to:

- Generation Next (professional wrestling), a professional wrestling stable
- Generation Next (album), the debut album from Aventura
- Generation Next (comics), a Marvel Comics team and eponymous series
- Generation neXt, one of the names for Yu-Gi-Oh! GX (it is the GX of the final title)
- Millennials, also known as Generation Next or Generation Y
- GeneratioNext, Pepsi ad campaign, variant of Pepsi Generation
  - "Move Over", also known as "Generation Next", a promotional single by the Spice Girls for the Pepsi ad campaign

== See also ==
- Next Generation (disambiguation)
