= New Generation Party =

New Generation Party is the name of political parties in several countries:

- New Generation Party (Romania)
- New Generation Party (Papua New Guinea)
- New Generation Party (Malaysia)
- New Generation Party (Costa Rica)
- New Generation Party (Cambodia)
