= Pepsi Generation =

Theme of an advertising campaign

The Pepsi Generation is the theme of an advertising campaign for Pepsi-Cola, an American brand of soft drink, that launched in 1963 as the result of a slogan contest. A new car was awarded to the writer of the winning slogan. The contest was the brainchild of Alan Pottasch, a PepsiCo advertising executive, and it was won by Appleton, Wisconsin resident, Ellen M. Reimer. Her slogan invited consumers to "Come Alive! You're the Pepsi Generation!" The original "Come Alive" jingle was performed by singer Joanie Sommers in her memorable "breathy" vocal style. As of 2025, this logo is still used on merchandising.

== History ==
Earlier campaigns for Pepsi-Cola had emphasized price competition. Twelve US fl oz (350 ml) Pepsi bottles contained nearly twice as much beverage as seven US fl oz (210 ml) standard Coca-Cola bottles, and Coca-Cola was by far the leading brand of soft drink. Pepsi launched a jingle campaign in 1939, "Pepsi-Cola Hits the Spot":

Pepsi-Cola hits the spot
Twelve full ounces, that's a lot!
Twice as much for a nickel, too
Pepsi-Cola is the drink for you.

This 1939 jingle focused on the simple proposition that Pepsi was just as good as Coke, but better value. The Pepsi Generation campaign represented a major shift away from that line of thinking; rather than being just as good as Coke, Pepsi was different from Coke. The Pepsi Generation and its associated jingle —

You've got a lot to live
And Pepsi's got a lot to give.

told Pepsi drinkers, now enrolled in the Pepsi Generation, that Pepsi-Cola was taking a stand with the "young" side of the 1960s-era "generation gap". Television ads featuring the campaign typically displayed young people pursuing exotic entertainments like motorcycle or watercycle riding or piloting a windship through a desert, while an announcer described Pepsi drinkers as people who saw the "young view of things". "Who is the Pepsi Generation? Livelier, active people with a liking for Pepsi-Cola!" Previous Coca-Cola advertisements had featured Norman Rockwell styled images of small towns and nostalgic scenes, as well as traditional figures such as Santa Claus. Pepsi told soft drink consumers that there are Coke people, and there are Pepsi people, and if you're a Pepsi person you are young, and the future's on your side.

This "image campaign" inspired Coca-Cola to do a similar "hip" campaign in 1971, "I'd Like to Teach the World to Sing (in Perfect Harmony)," which also sold the lifestyle rather than the soft drink itself.

Pottasch, creator of the campaign, said that "For us to name and claim a whole generation after our product was a rather courageous thing that we weren't sure would take off." The "Pepsi Generation" was one of the first and best known instances of what came to be known as "lifestyle marketing". It focused on portraying Pepsi drinkers as possessing desirable qualities such as youth, rather than on the characteristics of the product itself. Pottasch said that "Pepsi was young, spirited, people doing active things—playing volleyball on the beach.... but younger we said in mind, in attitude, in feeling. Young in spirit. Young in heart."

=== The Choice of a New Generation ===
In 1984, Pottasch repeated the themes of the Pepsi Generation with "The Choice of a New Generation" campaign. This launch coincided with Michael Jackson's appearance in commercials. During the time of the campaign, other actors and musicians have pitched the product, including Lionel Richie, Tina Turner, David Bowie, Glenn Frey, Gloria Estefan and the Miami Sound Machine and Michael J. Fox.

=== Generation Next ===
In January 1997, Pepsi announced its new global marketing campaign under the "GeneratioNext" slogan, a continuation of the "Pepsi Generation" advertisement theme. The new slogan aimed to replace the various catch phrases used in the United States such as "Nothing else is a Pepsi", and those used in international markets such as "Change the script" and "Choice of a new generation". Pepsi bought around four minutes of commercial time during the Super Bowl XXXI, which aired on 26 January 1997. The commercial was fast-paced and featured young boxers, waitresses and fun-seekers. Brian Swette, executive vice president and chief marketing officer at Pepsi, described the characters in it as "positive, in control and lay claim to the future—the antithesis of Generation X". The ads featured the jingle "Move Over", written by Mary Wood and Clifford Lane of the BBDO advertising agency, which contained the slogan "Generation Next". The lyrics of the song mock past musical styles such as "rave, rap, punk, metal" urging listeners to not "do it over, cause that's over", while embracing the "next page, next stage, next craze, next wave". The Spice Girls later recorded their own version of the jingle for the commercials they did for Pepsi.

Many other artists have also been the voice of the "Pepsi Generation" and "Generation Next" commercials, including Del Shannon, Michael Jackson, and Britney Spears.
