= AMD Next Generation Microarchitecture =

AMD Next Generation Microarchitecture may refer to:

- AMD Accelerated Processing Unit, a computer APU brand (formerly known as AMD Fusion)
- AMD Bobcat (processor), a computer processor architecture
- AMD Bulldozer (processor), a computer processor architecture, due in 2011
