= Kalahari Meerkat Project =

Biology research project

The Kalahari Meerkat Project, or KMP, is a long term research project focused on studying the evolutionary causes and ecological consequences of cooperative behaviors in meerkats. The secondary aims of the project are to determine what factors affect the reproductive success of the meerkats and what behavioral and physiological mechanisms control both reproduction and cooperative behavior. The project is also working on monitoring overall plant and animal populations within the reserve and work with the nearby community of Van Zylsrus in the areas of conservation and sustainable use of resources.

Situated at the Kuruman River Reserve in Northern Cape, South Africa, close to the border to Botswana, the project is jointly funded by Cambridge University and the Kalahari Research Trust.

== History ==
The project was founded in the early nineties by researchers (Prof. Tim Clutton-Brock) at Cambridge University. It was originally based on the Kgalagadi Transfrontier Park, but in 1993 moved to the Kuruman River Reserve, an area spanning approximately twenty square miles of semi-arid area of the Kalahari Desert on either side of the mostly dry Kuruman River. The reserve consists primarily of sparsely vegetated fossil dunes that flatten out near the river, which is usually dry. The project is now part of the university's "Large Animal Research Group" headed by Tim Clutton-Brock, FRS, who has headed the Meerkat project since 1993.

== Staff ==
The project usually has 10–15 volunteers who form the main meerkat project staff. They are supervised by a Field Coordinator and a Field Manager. Volunteers come from all over the world and the project is regularly hiring volunteers (see http://www.kalahari-meerkats.com/index.php?id=volunteers). In addition to the core researchers, Earthwatch volunteers aid in collecting research data after being partnered with a staff researcher. There is also usually a South African technician responsible for project logistics, 6–8 post-graduate interns from Europe or South Africa, and a number of doctorate and independent researchers carrying out their own research in the area. There are rarely fewer than 10 people working in the project area at any given time.

The principal investigators of the project are Prof. Tim Clutton-Brock, Professor of Animal Ecology at the University of Cambridge, and Prof. Marta Manser, Professor of Animal Behavior at the University of Zurich.

== Subjects ==
The KMP study encompasses 16 groups of meerkats, with six living exclusively on the reserve and the rest having ranges that extend into the surrounding farmland. Most members of the groups are familiar enough with the human researchers that they are undisturbed by their presence and are relatively easy to touch and collect samples from. Extremely accurate life history records are kept for each meerkat in the study populations, including the recording of births, deaths, pregnancies, lactation and oestrus cycles, changes in social status and group affiliation, and any abnormal behaviors or activities.

The project team offers film crews and wildlife photographers the chance to film the habituated groups of meerkats at the reserve. The KMP meerkats have been the subjects of several documentary programs, including:

- Meerkat Manor, a popular Animal Planet docu-drama series focused mostly on The Whiskers, one of the long-term study groups
- Ella, A Meerkat's Tale, a 2005 one-hour special from Oxford Scientific Films that follows the life of one young female that breaks the rules and has pups despite being a subordinate female
- Meerkats, a 2003 Nigel Marven film
- "Life of Mammals", a 2002 episode for Sir David Attenborough's series on BBC
- "Walking with Meerkats: Meerkat Madness", a 2001 30-minute National Geographic special produced by Big Wave TV that focuses on the Lazuli research group The title may refer to the BBC production Walking with Dinosaurs and its sister shows Walking with Beasts and Walking with Monsters.

In May 2010, Lapland Studio announced it was releasing a video game entitled Lead the Meerkats for the Nintendo Wii and would be donating proceeds from copies sold on the first day to the project. Clutton-Brock and Evi Bauer, president of the Friends of the Kalahari Meerkat Project, expressed excitement over the games release as a way to educate people about meerkats through a fairly realistic game.

== Friends of the Kalahari Meerkat Project ==
"Friends of the Kalahari Meerkat Project" is a legally independent, but functionally integrated, sponsoring organization of the project that was founded in Switzerland on 23 November 2007. Through this website, the Kalahari Meerkat Project releases information about the meerkats, including life history updates for all of the individual meerkats and the meerkat groups being studied, updates on the current groups, historical information on lost groups, and basic information about meerkats. The project uploads its own photographs and video footage of the meerkats, available for viewing for free.

In April 2008, the site began selling "Friends" packages to offer a way to support the project. The Friends package includes additional project information not published on the site, as well as detailed information comparing the actual project meerkats to their counterparts in Meerkat Manor. On 8 June 2008, the site was expanded to include a virtual store, powered by Zazzle, through which the project offers a variety of custom meerkat items. Proceeds from the items go to support the project and the Friends program.
