= Tim Clutton-Brock =

British zoologist

Tim Clutton-Brock FRS
- Born: Timothy Hugh Clutton-Brock; 13 August 1946 (age 80)
- Citizenship: British
- Education: University of Cambridge (PhD)
- Awards: C. Hart Merriam Award (1991); Frink Medal (1997); Darwin Medal (2012)
- Scientific career
- Fields: Zoology; Behavioural ecology
- Workplaces: University of Cambridge
- Thesis: Feeding and ranging behaviour of the red colobus monkey (1973)
- Doctoral advisor: Robert Hinde
- Website: www.zoo.cam.ac.uk/directory/tim-clutton-brock

Timothy Hugh Clutton-Brock FRS (born 13 August 1946) is a British zoologist known for his comparative studies of the behavioural ecology of mammals, particularly red deer and meerkats.

== Education ==
Clutton-Bruck was educated at Rugby School and at the University of Cambridge, where he also received his PhD in 1972.

== Career and research ==
As of 2008, he is the Prince Philip Professor of Ecology and Evolutionary Biology, and head of the Large Animal Research Group at the Department of Zoology of the University of Cambridge, and a fellow of Magdalene College, Cambridge. He also holds extraordinary professorships in the Department of Zoology and Entomology and the Mammal Research Institute of the University of Pretoria, South Africa.

Clutton-Brock's early work was on social behaviour in primates. Much of his recent work focuses on three long-term studies: of Red Deer on the Scottish island of Rùm, of Soay sheep on St Kilda, and of meerkats in the southern Kalahari. He is one of the founders of the Kalahari Meerkat Project, whose subjects featured in the television programme Meerkat Manor.

=== Books ===
- Readings in Sociobiology. Editor with Paul H. Harvey. (1978, W.H.Freeman & Company; ISBN 0-7167-0190-1)
- Red Deer: Behavior and Ecology of Two Sexes. With F. E. Guinness and S. D. Albon. (1982, University of Chicago Press; ISBN 0-226-11057-5)
- Life Histories in Comparative Perspective. With P.H. Harvey and R.D. Martin, R.D. (1987) In Primate Societies. Smuts, B.B., Cheney, D.L., Seyfarth, R.M., Wrangham, R.W., Struhsaker, T.T. (eds). Chicago & London:University of Chicago Press. pp. 181–196 ISBN 0-226-76715-9
- Rhum: The Natural History of an Island (Edinburgh Island Biology). Editor with M. E. Ball. (1987, Edinburgh University Press; ISBN 0-85224-513-0)
- Reproductive Success: Studies of Individual Variation in Contrasting Breeding Systems (Editor, 1990, University of Chicago Press; ISBN 0-226-11059-1)
- The Evolution of Parental Care (1991, Princeton University Press; ISBN 0-691-02516-9)
- Changes and Disturbance in Tropical Rainforest in SouthEast Asia. Editor with David M. G. Newbery and Ghillean T. Prance. (2000, World Scientific Publishing Company; ISBN 1-86094-243-1)
- Wildlife Population Growth Rates. Editor with R. M. Sibly and J. Hone. (2003, Cambridge University Press; ISBN 0-521-53347-3)
- Soay Sheep: Dynamics and Selection in an Island Population. Editor with Josephine Pemberton. (2004, Cambridge University Press; ISBN 0-521-52990-5)
- Meerkat Manor – The Story of Flower of the Kalahari (2007, Weidenfeld & Nicolson; ISBN 0-297-84484-9)
- Mammal Societies (2016, Wiley-Blackwell; ISBN 1119095328)

=== Reviews ===
- Clutton-Brock, TH; Parker, GA (1995). "Punishment in animal societies". Nature. 373 (6511): 209–216. Bibcode:1995Natur.373..209C. doi:10.1038/373209a0. PMID 7816134. S2CID 21638607.
- Clutton-Brock, TH (2007). "Sexual selection in Males and Females". Science. 318 (5858): 1882–1885. Bibcode:2007Sci...318.1882C. doi:10.1126/science.1133311. PMID 18096798. S2CID 6883765.

=== Articles ===
- Clutton-Brock, TH; Vincent, AC (May 1991). "Sexual selection and the potential reproductive rates of males and females". Nature. 351 (6321): 58–60. Bibcode:1991Natur.351...58G. doi:10.1038/351058a0. PMID 2027382. S2CID 4352089.
- Clutton-Brock, TH; Brotherton, PN; Russell, AF; et al. (January 2001). "Cooperation, control, and concession in meerkat groups". Science. 291 (5503): 478–81. Bibcode:2001Sci...291..478C. doi:10.1126/science.291.5503.478. PMID 11161200.
- Clutton-Brock, TH; Russell, AF; Sharpe, LL; Young, AJ; Balmforth, Z; McIlrath, GM (July 2002). "Evolution and development of sex differences in cooperative behavior in meerkats". Science. 297 (5579): 253–6. Bibcode:2002Sci...297..253C. doi:10.1126/science.1071412. PMID 12114627. S2CID 32362826.
- Clutton-Brock, TH; Coulson, TN; Milner-Gulland, EJ; Thomson, D; Armstrong, HM (February 2002). "Sex differences in emigration and mortality affect optimal management of deer populations". Nature. 415 (6872): 633–7. doi:10.1038/415633a. PMID 11832944. S2CID 4361201.
- Clutton-Brock, TH; Hodge, SJ; Spong, G; et al. (December 2006). "Intrasexual competition and sexual selection in cooperative mammals". Nature. 444 (7122): 1065–8. Bibcode:2006Natur.444.1065C. doi:10.1038/nature05386. PMID 17183322. S2CID 4397323.
- Lukas, D., & Clutton-Brock, T. H. (August 2013). "The evolution of social monogamy in mammals". Science.341: 526–530. doi:10.1126/science.1238677

=== Awards and honours ===
He was elected a Fellow of the Royal Society in 1993. He is an ISI Highly Cited researcher. He won the 1997 Frink Medal of the Zoological Society of London.

In 2012, he was awarded the Darwin Medal from the Royal Society for his work on the diversity of animal societies and demonstration of their effects on the evolution of reproductive strategies, and the operation of selection and the dynamics of populations.
