= Meerkat Manor =

British television series about a meerkat family

- Genre: Documentary; Drama
- Created by: Caroline Hawkins
- Narrated by: Bill Nighy (UK/Canada, Series 1-5/US, Series 5); Mike Goldman (Australia); Sean Astin (US, Series 1–3); Stockard Channing (US, Series 4)
- Country of origin: United Kingdom
- Original language: English
- No. of series: 5
- No. of episodes: 66 (list of episodes)

Production
- Executive producers: Mark Wild (UK); Simon Willock (OSF); Clare Birks (OSF); Mick Kaczorowski (US)
- Producers: Chris Barker; Anne Sommerfield; Lucinda Axelsson; Renoir Tuahene; Hayley Smith; Chris Harries
- Production location: Kalahari Desert
- Cinematography: John Brown; Robin Smith; Gavin Thurston; Ted Giffords; John Waters; Ralph Bower
- Editors: Renoir Tuahene; Amanda Young; Matt Meech; Mike Bolsover
- Running time: 24 minutes 45 minutes (Rise of the Dynasty)

Original release
- Network: Animal Planet International
- Release: 2 September 2005 – 22 August 2008
- Network: BBC America
- Release: June 2021 – September 2021

Meerkat Manor is a British television documentary produced by Oxford Scientific Films that premiered in September 2005. Originally broadcast on Animal Planet International for four seasons, until its cancellation in August 2008, the programme had a revival in 2021 with the programme now known as Meerkat Manor: Rise of the Dynasty in some countries. Using traditional animal documentary style footage along with narration, the series told the story of the Whiskers, one of more than a dozen families of meerkats in the Kalahari Desert being studied as part of the Kalahari Meerkat Project, a long-term field study into the ecological causes and evolutionary consequences of the cooperative nature of meerkats. The original programme was narrated by Bill Nighy, with the narration redubbed by Mike Goldman for the Australian airings and Sean Astin for the American broadcasts. The fourth series, subtitled The Next Generation, saw Stockard Channing replacing Astin as the narrator in the American dubbing. In 2021, Nighy could be heard narrating the new series of Meerkat Manor when it was broadcast in the United States on BBC America and on Channel 5 in the United Kingdom, making it the first time that both television markets have used the same voice over on the programme.

Meerkat Manor premiered in the United Kingdom on 12 September 2005, and the first 13-episode series concluded on 24 October 2005. With the success of the programme in the United Kingdom, Animal Planet started broadcasting it on its national channels in Australia, Canada, and the US. It has since been rebroadcast in more than 160 other countries. The fourth, and final, Animal Planet series aired initially in the United States from 6 June 2008 to 22 August 2008. In August 2009, it was reported that the programme had been cancelled by Animal Planet. In 2021, Meerkat Manor returned to British TV screens with a new series subtitled onscreen as Rise of the Dynasty (as Channel 5 listed the programme just as Meerkat Manor). The 13-part series was again narrated by Nighy, and was shown by Channel 5 every weekday in the 6.30pm slot usually featuring quiz show Eggheads, with the last episode going out on Wednesday 15 December 2021. The Rise of the Dynasty series was made by Oxford Scientific Films (with the master rights belonging to BBC America) and featured three mobs of meerkats, with the groups being given the names Whiskers, Hakuna Matata and Ubuntu.

Although the show faced criticism from viewers for not intervening when a meerkat was injured and faced death, Meerkat Manor enjoyed considerable success and was Animal Planet's top series in October 2007, both on the cable channel and through its video-on-demand service. The show's experimental format broke new ground in animal documentary filming techniques and gave viewers a long-term, intimate look into the lives of its meerkat stars, breaking the traditional wall between viewer and subject found with most documentaries. Meerkat Manor was nominated for three Primetime Emmy Awards: two in 2007 and one in 2008. It won awards at the 2006 Omni Awards, and at the 2006 and 2007 New York Festivals TV Broadcasting Awards. The first three series have been released to DVD in both Region 1 and Region 2. In 2007, a book entitled Meerkat Manor – The Story of Flower of the Kalahari was released in the UK, detailing the life of Flower and the Whiskers before the series' filming began. A television film, Meerkat Manor: The Story Begins, documenting Flower's birth and rise to matriarch of the Whiskers, aired on Animal Planet on 25 May 2008. A photo-realistic theatrical animated feature film based on the series is in development at Warner Bros. Pictures Animation as of April 2024.

== Production details ==
Robin Smith finds himself surrounded by foraging meerkats while filming them

Meerkat Manor was created by Caroline Hawkins, executive producer and series editor at Oxford Scientific Films, and commissioned for Animal Planet International by executive producer and commissioning editor Mark Wild. Filming for a 13-episode series took seven to eight months, and was limited to the Kalahari spring and summer seasons, as meerkats are less active during winter. Series three was filmed from November 2006 through April 2007, and Series four began filming in October 2007. Most scenes were filmed on location at the Kuruman River Reserve, where the Kalahari Meerkat Project that the meerkats are a part of is based. However, the meerkats seen in commercials and on the show's website were not the same animals portrayed in Meerkat Manor. Instead, tamer-rescued meerkats from the Fellow Earthlings' Wildlife Center were filmed against a green screen.

The show was primarily filmed using Sony DSR-570 cameras, although special equipment was needed for some unique footage. For scenes inside the animals' burrows, mini fibre-optic infra-red cameras were employed; wide-angle shots were filmed with a seven-metre crane and a remote-controlled camera platform. An off-camera wireless microphone was also used to record many meerkat vocalizations, only partially audible to cameras' on-board systems. Most filming was done by a single cameraman and a single sound engineer; researchers have required a minimal human presence to avoid stressing the animals. Eye-level shots were difficult to achieve at times, due to the meerkats' small size and the limited height of even the smallest tripods.

For tracking purposes by the researchers, the dominant female of each group is fitted with a radio collar, as are some dominant and roaming males. The meerkats – especially younger animals – are marked with dye to differentiate them. As the meerkats are habituated, they would tend to ignore the camera crew as long as their "personal space" was respected.

=== National variations ===
The UK and US versions of the show have the same content for most episodes; however, the latter was sometimes edited for length to allow for commercial breaks. Content was also sometimes altered; mating scenes in particular were often removed from the US version. Animal Planet US occasionally changed the names of meerkats and episode titles. Two of Flower's pups were renamed from Ren and Stumpy to Len and Squiggy; the title of the episode was also changed. De la Soul (named for the rap group of the same name), one of the sisters who started the Starsky group, was renamed Whoopi in the US as a tribute to actress Whoopi Goldberg, an early fan of the series. Animal Planet US has also renamed some of Flower's pups born in series three after two other celebrity fans of the show, Elizabeth Taylor and Denis Leary. Several episodes were renamed: the title of the final episode of the second series was changed from "The Killing Fields" to "The Quiet Fields". During the third series, the third episode's title was changed from "Something's Got to Give" to "Sister Act" (another Goldberg reference), while the sixth episode's title changed from "The House of Zappa" to "Sibling Rivalry".

== Narrative ==
The use of underground cameras allows the crew to capture never before seen footage of a meerkat mother and her pups deep in their burrow.

The show follows several groups of meerkats, who act communally for the benefit of the groups in which they live. These groups are typically led by a dominant female and male, who maintain almost exclusive rights to have offspring. The group followed most closely is known as the Whiskers family. This group was chosen because of its matriarch Flower, an unusually successful dominant female who led the group for five years. During series three, Flower died from a snake bite and was succeeded by her daughter Rocket Dog.

Animals in neighbouring groups were highlighted in each series as well. In the first series, a group called the Lazuli were shown frequently in competition with the Whiskers family, and the opening credits referred to them as the "neighbours from hell". Although their dominant male Big Si died between series, the Lazuli appeared in the second series, mostly as a source of roving males. Another group called the Commandos, led by a one-eyed male named Hannibal, introduced themselves by attacking the Lazuli burrow, killing a pup and badly wounding the babysitting adult. The Commandoes became the new major rivals in the area, killing the pups of evicted Whiskers female Mozart and taking over some of the Whiskers' territory.

The Whiskers' new neighbours were the Zappa and the Starsky. Although smaller than the Whiskers, the Zappa attacked frequently, and when they fled after one attack, the Whiskers – in a rare occurrence – adopted an abandoned Zappa pup. The Starsky group, on the other hand, was no threat to the Whiskers. Formed by a trio of Flower's daughters permanently evicted from the Whiskers, the small group was ravaged by illness, predators, and a lack of new pups. The constantly struggling Starsky succumbed in the penultimate episode, with the death of the last survivor, Mozart, who was killed by a jackal. Former Whiskers female Maybelline broke away from the group at the end of the third series, forming a new group called the Aztecs which became the Whiskers' rivals in the fourth series.

=== Changes in representation ===
While the show portrays real events among the Kalahari Meerkats, it also removes repetitive elements of the animals' lives. Because many days are filled with behaviour related to grooming and foraging, these routines were often left out of the show in favour of more unusual events.

The meerkats are all named by Kalahari Meerkat volunteers; the individual who first sees a new litter emerge from the burrow is awarded naming rights. This has produced a variety of names, frequently drawn from volunteers' favourite books, movies, musical groups, family and friends, historical figures and geographical locations. Animal Planet sometimes renamed the meerkats for narration, arguing that researchers' names were too limited, often relating to spices and food condiments. Because of these changes, fans of the series who seek information on the Friends of the Kalahari Meerkat Project website sometimes have trouble locating particular animals. The project has created a list of alterations to help viewers connect the animals on the show to their real-life counterparts, and to match episodes to the monthly KMP Life History reports. The list, however, is only available to paying members of their website.

Two of the major Whiskers family rivals were composites, created with footage and blended stories from multiple groups. For example, the Commandos group on the show uses some of events from the real Commandos group, but was primarily shown with footage from the Vivian research group – including its dominant couple. Similarly, the show's Zappa group was mostly presented using footage from a group called "The Young Ones" (named after the British television show); however, the actual story and dominant pair were from the real Zappa Group. Axel, the abandoned pup from series three, has a research number that indicates he was probably a Young Ones pup, rather than being a Zappa as the show claims.

== Reception ==
Meerkat Manor has been well received by viewers and critics alike. In October 2007, it was Animal Planet's top series, with an audience of more than four million in the United States alone. In the United States, its first episode was viewed by one million viewers, and the second and third series premieres were watched by approximately 800,000 viewers each. The fourth series premiere did not fare as well, with fewer than 500,000 viewers. The viewership of the on-demand video offerings for Meerkat Manor grew 20% in September 2007, when Discovery offered each third series episode, video capsules of series one and two, top ten moments from the show, and a memorial sequence for Flower. Building on the success of Meerkat Manor's unique format, Animal Planet commissioned two similarly formatted programmes: Orangutan Island, which focuses on a group of orphaned orangutans at the Nyaru Menteng Orangutan Rescue and Rehabilitation Center, and Lemur Street, which looks at the lives of two rival gangs of ring-tailed lemurs in Madagascar.

Some fans have criticized the show for its non-interference policy with regard to the meerkats, asking why the film crew and researchers do not give anti-venom to snake-bitten meerkats, or euthanize those dying and suffering. US Executive Producer Mick Kaczorowski pointed out that Meerkat Manor was a show about the real lives and deaths of the meerkats. The research group has a policy against film crews interceding in natural events "because they don't want to have an effect on the gene pool by saving a weaker meerkat [or] affecting the outcome of what's natural in the Kalahari." As the research project is monitoring "...the breeding success and survival of individuals and ... the factors that affect reproduction and survival", interfering in the natural processes would render the research results invalid. There is one exception to this rule: researchers will euthanize meerkats that contract tuberculosis in order to prevent outbreaks that would threaten both the meerkat population and nearby cattle.

=== Awards ===
Meerkat Manor was nominated in 2005 for a Jackson Hole Wildlife Film Festival Award in the Animal Behaviour category, and again in 2007 for Best Original Score. At the 2006 Wildscreen Festival, the series was a finalist in three categories: Animal Behaviour, Innovation, and Popular Broadcast. The series won Gold Statues in Natural History and Cinematography and a Silver Statue for Writing at the 2006 Omni Awards. The eighth episode of series three, "Journey's End", which depicts the death of Whiskers matriarch Flower, was awarded the 2008 Wildscreen Festival Panda Award in the Five Award for Popular Broadcast Programme category. Meerkat Manor was a two-time Gold Medal winner in the Nature & Wildlife category at the New York Festivals Award Gala, in 2006 for series one, and again in 2007 for series one and two. The series was nominated for two Primetime Emmy Awards in 2007, one for Outstanding Cinematography for Nonfiction Programming and one for Outstanding Picture Editing for Nonfiction Programming, and again for Outstanding Cinematography in 2008. In 2009, the series was awarded the Grand Award at the New York Festivals International Television Programming and Promotion Awards in the Family Programmes category.

=== Impact on the genre ===
Meerkat Manor's innovative new methods of filming allowed the Kalahari Project scientists a chance to uncover aspects of meerkat life never before seen, including life within the burrows. The film crew was also the first to capture meerkat infanticide on film.

While many documentaries maintain an emotional distance from their subjects, Meerkat Manor, due to its extended length, soap opera-like narration, romanticization of the animals' lives, and close-up filming techniques, provides a closer, more personal view of the meerkats. The animals are humanized by being given individual names and personalities and by narrativizing the plots of their specific social relationships, blurring the line between nature documentary and reality television. Viewers describe being emotionally involved in the animals' lives, sometimes forgetting they are watching a nature documentary. The meerkats' frequently short lives and brutal deaths become surprising and disturbing to some audiences. This format, considered experimental for its time, has been both praised and criticized for expanding the boundaries of both the nature documentary genre and the conventions of reality TV.

Like the meerkats, Manor is an odd beast. The crew is forbidden to intervene, and the producers don't sugarcoat the animals' less cuddly habits (infidelity, abandonment of young, occasional cannibalism). But the meerkats are named and given human traits ("courageous," "caring," "bully[ing]"), and their antics and tragedies take place over a sound track. Manor is both brutal and melodramatic and thus more devastating than most documentary or scripted drama.

— James Poniewozik, Time, 2 November 2007

== Merchandise ==
Cover of the original UK release of Meerkat Manor: The Story of Flower of the Kalahari

A book written by Professor Tim Clutton-Brock entitled Meerkat Manor: The Story of Flower of the Kalahari (ISBN 0-297-84484-9) was released in the UK in a hardback edition on 4 October 2007. The book focuses on Flower's life and the story of the Whiskers, tracing how the group started, providing a timeline of Flower's life, and detailing all of the pups she had over her lifetime, as well as their current locations. The book also gives more background on how the Kalahari Meerkat Project started, the research goals and results, and researchers' personal lives. A paperback edition of the book was announced for release in the United States by Simon & Schuster through their Touchstone imprint on 15 April 2008. The US release was entitled Meerkat Manor: Flower of the Kalahari (ISBN 1-4165-8767-5). In November 2007, Discovery Communications announced that it was partnering with Activision to make a video game based on Meerkat Manor as the first in a new series of nature-based games. The announcement stated the game would be released to multiple platforms in late 2008, but no game was ever released.

=== Film ===
Oxford Scientific Films produced a feature film for Discovery Films that acts as a prequel to the Meerkat Manor series. Originally announced as Flower: Queen of the Kalahari, Meerkat Manor: The Story Begins was directed by Chris Barker and Mike Slee and narrated by Whoopi Goldberg. The film documents Flower's early life as she grows from a young meerkat to become one of the most successful leaders of the Whiskers clan. The film was introduced at the 2008 Tribeca Film Festival in the Spotlight section, and then aired in the United States on Animal Planet on 25 May 2008 as a lead-in to a thirty-minute Making of Meerkat Manor: the Story Begins special. It was released to Region 1 DVD in North America on 3 June 2008, with the Making of Meerkat Manor special, and another special, The Science of Meerkat Manor, included as extras.

The film included re-edited footage and a new musical score. The Whiskers story was simplified, with the Lazuli being the only rival group to appear in the film. Unlike with the Meerkat Manor series, the film does not actually depict any of the real Whiskers meerkats. Untrained "meerkat actors" play the role of Flower and her family, with the camera crew searching out appropriately-aged meerkats, then following them until the meerkats acted in a way that was needed for the film. Flower herself was depicted by approximately eight female meerkats.
