= Oxford Scientific Films =

British company that produces natural history and documentary programmes

- Company type: Subsidiary
- Industry: Television production Film production
- Genre: Documentary; Nature
- Founded: 8 July 1968; 57 years ago in Oxford, UK
- Founder: Gerald Thompson; Peter Parks; John Paling; Sean Morris; David Thompson
- Headquarters: London, United Kingdom
- Key people: Clare Birks (CEO); Caroline Hawkins (Creative Director)
- Products: Meerkat Manor; Lemur Kingdom; Fatal Attractions
- Parent: Circle Communications (1996–1998); Southern Star Group (1998–2009); Fairfax Media (2009–2011); Boomerang Plus (2011–2012); Boom Pictures (2012–2013); Twofour Group (2013–2015); ITV Studios (2015–present)
- Website: oxfordscientificfilms.tv

Oxford Scientific Films (OSF) is a British production company that produces natural history and documentary programmes owned by ITV Studios. Founded as an independent company on 8 July 1968, by documentary filmmaker Gerald Thompson, it broke new ground in the world of documentaries, using new filming techniques and capturing footage of never before filmed activities of its various subjects. In 1996, Oxford Scientific Films was sold to Circle Communications, where it retained its own identity as a division within the company. The following year, Circle Communications was taken over by Southern Star Entertainment UK. Under the new ownership, Oxford Scientific Films produced multiple award-winning programmes and films, including the Animal Planet series Meerkat Manor.

In March 2008, Southern Star merged its Sydney-based factual business division into the Oxford Scientific Films division, using the OSF name for specialist documentaries, and "Southern Star Factual" for its features and entertainment style documentaries. When Southern Star was sold to Endemol, Oxford Scientific Films was retained by parent company Fairfax Media. In 2011, Boomerang Plus acquired the company. In 2012, Oxford Scientific Films became part of Boom Pictures, which merged with the Twofour Group in 2013, which was acquired by ITV Studios in 2015.

== History ==
=== Formation and growth ===
In 1967, Gerald Thompson, a film maker and Oxford University lecturer, was approached by the Ealing Corporation of Harvard University about expanding their catalogue of educational short films. Universal Education and Visual Arts, a New York City company, was also interested in talking with Thompson. Thompson and five of his associates and former students (Peter Parks, who worked with plankton; John Paling, a fish specialist who worked with Parks; recent Oxford graduate Sean Morris; zoologist John Cooke; and Eric Skinner, who assisted Thompson with his films) wanted to form an independent film company. Thompson and Parks travelled to America to meet with the two companies to show their work. At the end of the meeting, they told the head of the company about their desire to open their own company and, impressed with the films he'd seen, he offered to finance them for the first three years and give them the funds to build a place to work.

When they returned to the United Kingdom, Thompson sold them a quarter acre of his garden, at a steeply discounted price, to be the home for the new building. They formed Oxford Scientific Films, taking part of the name from Parks' existing company Oxford Biological Films. Thompson, Parks, Morris, Paling, and Thompson's son David, headed the new company, which began operating on 8 July 1968. Thompson remained at his position at Oxford University while the company building was being completed, while the other four travelled to America to make the film loops for Ealing. Thompson resigned from the university on 2 September 1969, to work at Oxford Scientific Films full-time.

The company focused initially on filming nature at a microscopic level, including insect and aquatic wildlife. Using specialised equipment and camera techniques the developed themselves, the company gained fame for its ability to record never before seen footage of the natural world. Its cinematographers became experts in micro, macro, snorkel, slow-motion and time-lapse photography. As the company grew, it expanded into other innovative filming and post-production techniques, and moved from creating short loops to creating television programmes and series, commercials, and feature films.

=== Southern Star acquisition ===
In September 1996, Oxford Scientific Films was purchased by film and television rights company Circle Communications for £3.9 million. £3.85 million of the purchase price was paid in cash, with the rest paid through a stock exchange. Less than a year later, in May 1997, Australia-based Southern Star Entertainment made a £8.3 million take over bid for Circle Communications, due to its distribution business, strong catalogue, and the company's drama and factual production business. Oxford Scientific Films, which had retained its own identity under Circle Communications, became a core division of Southern Star Entertainment.

On 4 December 2003, Oxford Scientific's extensive libraries of over 350,000 still images and over 2,000 of film footage libraries were acquired by Photolibrary. The acquisition was done as a share exchange, with Photolibrary acquiring shares in Oxford Scientific Films Limited, and Southern Star paying A$1 million to purchase a 46.46% equity in Photolibrary. Photolibrary retained existing employees of the library divisions, and continues using the names "Oxford Scientific" and "OSF" in promoting the libraries. Southern Star retained full control of Oxford Scientific Films production unit, and through that unit, continues supplying images and footage to the Photolibrary.

In March 2008, parent company Southern Star Group merged its Sydney-based "factual business unit" into the Oxford Scientific Films division. The merged company now uses two brands, with the existing Oxford Scientific Films name being used for its "specialist factual programmes", while the Southern Star Factual brand would be used for "features and factual entertainment shows."

=== Recent history ===
In 2009, Southern Star was acquired by Endemol from Fairfax Media, with Oxford Scientific Films retained by Fairfax Media. In 2011, Boomerang Plus acquired Oxford Scientific Films from Fairfax Media, which transferred the company to Boom Pictures in 2012, which became part of the Twofour Group, which was acquired on 24 June 2015 by ITV Studios.

== Notable works ==
Oxford Scientific Films has produced numerous award-winning programmes and films. In 1998, its film "The Forbidden Fruit" produced for the BBC's long-running series The Natural World and WNET Nature, won seven industry awards. Heroes of the High Frontier, produced as a National Geographic Special, won four awards and was a finalist for the Best of the Show Grand Award Trophy at the New York Festivals.

In 2005, the company launched Meerkat Manor, a docu-drama commissioned for Animal Planet. The series has since become Animal Planet's highest rated series, and has been nominated for two Primetime Emmy Awards, two Jackson Hole Wildlife Film Festival Awards and was a finalist at the 2006 Wildscreen Festival It won multiple awards at the 2006 Omni Awards and 2006 and 2007 New York Festivals Award Gala. The series is also noted for capturing never before seen aspects of the lives of meerkats, being the first to capture meerkat infanticide on film, and for expanding the boundaries of the documentary genre.

=== Other works ===
- SpongeBob SquarePants (horse-fly footage in "Wormy")
- Baby Einstein (footage)
- Bill Nye the Science Guy (footage)
- Fatal Attractions
- Lemur Kingdom
- Australia: Earth's Magical Kingdom
- Download: The True Story of the Internet
- Pulse
- Frankenstein Unbound
- Secrets of the Elephants
- Secrets of the Spy Whale
- Pure Rage: The Making of '28 Days Later
- Murder in the Pacific
- Pandas: The Journey Home
- Isolation
- Salmon Fishing in the Yemen
- The Life of Birds
- The Hitchhiker's Guide to the Galaxy
- The Secret Life of Our Pets
- Bridge to Terabithia
- Superman
- 28 Weeks Later
- Massive Engines
- Hellraiser
- Saturn 3
- Kafka
- The Last King of Scotland
- Alvin and the Chipmunks: The Squeakquel
- Altered States
- When the Wind Blows
- Darkman
- Attack the Block
- Exorcist II: The Heretic
- Inseminoid
- Supergirl
- Life of Pi
- Life on Earth
- China: Nature's Ancient Kingdom
- Magical Land of Oz
- Wild Tokyo
- One Life
- Balderdash & Piffle
- Amazing Animal Friends
- This Filthy Earth
- A Very British Country House
- Driven: The Billy Monger Story
- Wild Korea
- Wild Weather
- Brothers of the Head
- A Very British Hotel
- The Secret Life of Dogs
- The Dog with an IQ of 102
- Secrets of the Spy Whale
- Indigenous Animals
- Dogs With Extraordinary Jobs
- Secret Life of Farm Animals
- Dogs Might Fly
- World's Oddest Animal Couples
- Animal Mums
- Nature Nuts With Julian Clary
- Carol Klein's Plant Odyssey
- The Secret Life of Cats
- The Secret Life of Twins
- Animals in Love
- The Queens Garden
- Chuck Amuck: The Movie
- Guinness World Records 2005
- Wild Weather with Richard Hammond
- Richard Hammond's Miracles of Nature
- Honey Badgers: Masters of Mayhem
- Wild Korea: Life at the Borderlands
- Connected: The Power of Six Degrees
- The Secret Life of Growing Up
- St David's: Britain's Smallest City
- Schneider's 2nd Stage
- Ratopolis
- The Dinosaur Mummy
- Ingenious Animals
- The Trainer and the Racehorse: The Legend of Frankel
- Carol Klein's Plant Odysseys
- Secrets of the Stonehenge Skeletons
- Rory McGrath's Pub Dig
- How to Win the Grand National
- Nelson: In His Own Words
- The Royal Institution Christmas Lectures
- Dinosaurs: Return to Life?
- Jessica the Hippo
- The Beach
- Secrets of Growing Old
- Dominic Sandbrook: Let Us Entertain You
- The Tender Trap
- Survival: Small Is Beautiful
- Death by Excess
- Mark Williams on the Rails
- Living with Bugs: Close Encounters
- Patterns of Life
- Le vivant et l'artificiel
- The Whistleblowers: Behind the Scenes
- Darwin's Daughter
- Living with Bugs: War of Two Worlds
- Amazing Planet: Mummies Unwrapped
- A Thousand Million Million Ants
- Nature Nuts with Julian Clary
- Food Prices: The Shocking Truth
- National Geographic Specials
- Webs and Other Wonders
