= 2012 New Year Honours =

British honours and awards

The New Year Honours 2012 were announced on 31 December 2011 in the United Kingdom, New Zealand, Antigua and Barbuda, Grenada, Belize, Saint Christopher and Nevis, the Solomon Islands, Saint Vincent and the Grenadines, and the Cook Islands, to celebrate the year passed and mark the beginning of 2012.

The recipients of honours are displayed as they were styled before their new honour and arranged by the country (in order of independence) whose ministers advised The Queen on the appointments, then by honour with grades i.e. Knight/Dame Grand Cross, Knight/Dame Commander etc. and then divisions i.e. Civil, Diplomatic and Military as appropriate.

== United Kingdom ==
=== Knights Bachelor ===
- Gerald Acher, CBE, LVO. For charitable services.
- Rodney Aldridge, OBE. Chair, The Aldridge Foundation. For services to Young People.
- Charles Lamb Allen, CBE. For services to the 2012 Olympics and Paralympics.
- John Alexander Armitt, CBE. Chair, Olympic Delivery Authority. For services to Engineering and Construction.
- Peter Lytton Bazalgette. TV Producer. For services to Broadcasting.
- Michael David Bear. Lately Lord Mayor of London. For services to Regeneration, Charity and the City of London.
- Professor Stephen Robert Bloom. Head, Division of Diabetes and Endocrinology, Imperial College London. For services to Medical Science.
- Dr John Gordon St Clair Buchanan. Chairman, Smith & Nephew. For services to Industry.
- Professor Simon Kirwan Donaldson. Royal Society Professor of Mathematics, Imperial College London. For services to Mathematics.
- Herbert Douglas Ellis, OBE. For charitable services.
- Roger James Gale, MP. For public and political services.
- Professor Andre Konstantin Geim. Professor of Physics, University of Manchester. For services to Science.
- Professor Brian Mellor Greenwood, CBE. Professor, Clinical Tropical Medicine, London School of Hygiene and Tropical Medicine. For services to malaria research in Africa
- Geoffrey Hall. Lately Principal and Chief Executive, New College Nottingham. For services to Further Education.
- Professor Geoffrey William Hill. Poet and Critic. For services to Literature.
- George Iacobescu, CBE. For services to Charity, Community and the Financial Services Industry.
- Professor Diarmaid Ninian John MacCulloch. Professor of the History of the Church, University of Oxford. For services to Scholarship.
- Professor Konstantin Novoselov. Professor of Physics, University of Manchester. For services to Science.
- Antonio Pappano. Music Director, Royal Opera House. For services to Music.
- Professor Mark Brian Pepys. Professor of Medicine and Head of Medicine Division, University College London Medical School, Royal Free Hospital. For services to Biomedicine.
- Dr Venkatraman Ramakrishnan. Scientist, Medical Research Council, Laboratory of Molecular Biology. For services to Molecular Biology.
- David Edward Reid. Lately chairman, Tesco plc and chairman, Kwik-Fit Group. For services to Business and to Charity.
- Paul Ruddock. Philanthropist. For services to the Arts.
- Robert Russell, MP. For public service.
- Professor John Gerald Patrick Sissons. Regius Professor of Physic, University of Cambridge. For services to Research and Education in Clinical Medicine.
- Professor Christopher Maxwell Snowden. Vice-chancellor, University of Surrey. For services to Engineering and to Higher Education.
- Professor Robert Tony Watson, CMG. Chief Scientific Adviser, Department for Environment, Food and Rural Affairs.
- The Honourable (Frederik) Gordon (Roy) Ward, OBE. Lately Chief Justice, Turks and Caicos Islands. For services to the judiciary in the Turks and Caicos Islands and the Commonwealth
- Andrew Witty. chief executive officer, GlaxoSmithKline. For services to the Economy and to the UK Pharmaceutical Industry.

=== Order of the Bath ===
==== Knight Commander of the Order of the Bath (KCB) ====
Military Division

- Air Marshal Kevin James Leeson, CBE, Royal Air Force
- Vice Admiral Paul Lambert, CB, Royal Navy
- Lieutenant General Mark Francis Noel Mans, CBE, British Army, late Corps of Royal Engineers

Civil Division

- The Honourable Alexander Claud Stuart Allan. Lately Chairman of the Joint Intelligence Committee and Head of Intelligence Assessment.
- Jeremy John Heywood, CB, CVO. Permanent Secretary, 10 Downing Street.

==== Companions of the Order of the Bath (CB) ====
Military Division

- Major General Nicholas John Caplin, British Army, late Army Air Corps
- Major General Clive Chapman, British Army, late The Parachute Regiment
- Air Vice-Marshal Michael John Harwood, CBE, Royal Air Force
- Vice Admiral Philip Andrew Jones, Royal Navy
- Major General Patrick Claude Marriott, CBE, British Army, late The Queen's Royal Lancers
- Air Vice-Marshal Christopher Brian Morris, Royal Air Force
- Major General Jeremy Hywel Thomas, DSO, Royal Marines

Civil Division

- James Bowler. Principal Private Secretary, 10 Downing Street
- Andrew Peter Hudson. Director General, Public Services, HM Treasury
- Catriona Wendy Campbell Laing. International Director, Justice Policy Group, Ministry of Justice
- Carol Patricia Moore. Lately Director, Justice Policy, Northern Ireland Executive
- Richard Dixon Murray. Director, Financial Planning and Allocations, Department of Health
- Rachel Sandby-Thomas. Solicitor and Director General, Legal People and Communications, Department for Business, Innovation and Skills

=== The Most Distinguished Order of Saint Michael and Saint George ===
==== Knight Commander of the Order of Saint Michael and Saint George (KCMG) ====
- The Honourable Dominic Anthony Gerard Asquith, CMG. Lately HM Ambassador, Egypt
- Michael Leigh. Lately Director General, Enlargement, European Commission, Brussels. For services to the enlargement of the European Union
- David Alexander Warren, CMG. HM Ambassador, Japan

==== Companions of the Order of St Michael and St George (CMG) ====
- Colin Robert Armstrong, OBE. Executive President, AGRIPAC and Honorary Consul, Guayaquil, Ecuador. For services to UK business and the British community in Ecuador
- Graham John Lloyd Avery. Lately Director, European Commission, Brussels. For services to European affairs
- James Nicholas Geoffrey Bowden, OBE. Lately HM Ambassador, Kingdom of Bahrain
- Robert John Dean. Director, Foreign & Commonwealth Office
- Timothy Mark Hitchens, LVO. Director, Foreign & Commonwealth Office
- Jan Marceli Kopernicki. Lately President, British Chamber of Shipping. For services to the safety and security of the international shipping community
- Mrs Judith Anne MacGregor, LVO. HM Ambassador, Mexico
- Ms Shan Elizabeth Morgan. HM Ambassador, Argentina
- Dr Robert George Stevens. Director, Foreign & Commonwealth Office
- Dr Christian Philip Hollier Turner. Director, Foreign & Commonwealth Office

=== The Royal Victorian Order ===
==== Dame Commander of the Royal Victorian Order (DCVO) ====
- Sarah Jane Frances Goad. Lord-Lieutenant of Surrey

==== Knight Commander of the Royal Victorian Order (KCVO) ====
- The Right Honourable The Earl Erne. Lord-Lieutenant of County Fermanagh
- Walter Robert Alexander Ross, CVO. Secretary and Keeper of the Records, Duchy of Cornwall

==== Commander of the Royal Victorian Order (CVO) ====
- Denis Brennan. Formerly head of Honours and Appointments Secretariat, Cabinet Office
- The Honourable Mark Thomas Bridges. Personal Solicitor to The Queen
- Michael Ashley Cecil Brinton. Lord-Lieutenant of Worcestershire
- Nigel James Cubitt Buchanan. Formerly Trustee, Outward Bound Trust
- John Barnard Bush, OBE. Lord-Lieutenant of Wiltshire
- William Nicholas Hood, CBE. Council Member, Duchy of Cornwall
- Sally Seabourne McCorquodale, LVO. Lady in Waiting to the Duchess of Gloucester
- Terence John Regan, LVO. Lead Trustee, International Special Projects Adviser, The Duke of Edinburgh's Award.
- Gillian Shirazi, LVO. Formerly Secretary General, The Duke of Edinburgh's International Award Scheme

==== Lieutenant of the Royal Victorian Order (LVO) ====
- The Honourable Virginia Carington. Assistant Master of the Household to The Prince of Wales and The Duchess of Cornwall
- Mrs Margaret Eleanor Hammond, MVO. Lady in Waiting to The Princess Royal
- Jonathan David Jagger. Surgeon Oculist to The Queen
- Dr James Roy Robertson, MBE. Apothecary to the Royal Household, Palace of Holyroodhouse
- Lt Col Anthony John Charles Woodrow, OBE, MC, QGM. Chief of Staff and private secretary to the Lieutenant-Governor of Jersey

==== Member of the Royal Victorian Order (MVO) ====
- Mrs Margaret Ashby. Head of Learning and Development, Personnel Office, Royal Household.
- Miss Claire Jocelyn Bostock. Travel Officer, Royal Household.
- Mrs Julia Ann Brown. Formerly Deputy Clerk to the Lieutenancy of Warwickshire.
- Miss Shelley Anne Chambers. Deputy head of Audit Services, Royal Household.
- Steven Brian Davidson. Horological Conservator, Windsor Castle.
- Acting Chief Inspector Paul Ephgrave. Metropolitan Police Service. For services to Royalty Protection.
- Miss Janice Claire Galvin. Specialist Sales Supervisor, Ticket Sales and Information Office, Royal Household.
- Timothy Michael Grenville Gray. Estate Surveyor, Duchy of Cornwall.
- Lee Hunt. Electrician, Royal Household.
- Carl Anthony Jackson. Director of Music, Her Majesty's Chapel Royal, Hampton Court Palace.
- Jeffrey Kevin Johnson. Deputy Records manager, Household of The Prince of Wales and The Duchess of Cornwall.
- Sgt Ieuan Dyfrig Jones. Metropolitan Police Service. For services to Royalty Protection.
- Geoffrey Ian Mackrell. Superintendent and Visitor manager, Palace of Holyroodhouse.
- Matthew Norman Hawkshaw Moss. Private secretary to the vice-Chancellor, University of Cambridge.

=== Royal Victorian Medal ===
==== Royal Victorian Medal (Gold) ====
- David James Benefer, RVM. Glasshouses manager, Sandringham Estate.

==== Royal Victorian Medal (Silver) ====
- Phillip David Chancellor. Formerly Verger, The Queen's Chapel of the Savoy.
- Miss Teresa Lesley Connors. Admissions manager, Her Majesty's Tower of London.
- Mrs Marion Rose Cox. Part-time Gardener, Highgrove House.
- Arthur George Fernie. Stalker and Gamekeeper, Balmoral Estate.
- Div Sgt Maj Albert Douglas Lewis Field. The Queen's Body Guard of the Yeomen of the Guard.
- Mrs Victoria Frances Hartles. Assistant Chef, Household of The Prince of Wales and The Duchess of Cornwall.
- Joseph MacLugash. Woods Foreman, Balmoral Estate.
- Stephen Mark Niedojadlo. The Duke of Edinburgh's Page.
- Graham Passmore Stone. Horticulturalist, Crown Estate, Windsor.

=== The Most Excellent Order of the British Empire ===
==== Dame Grand Cross of the Order of the British Empire (GBE) ====
- The Right Honourable The Baroness Hayman. For services to the House of Lords.

==== Dame Commander of The Order of the British Empire (DBE) ====
- Professor Glynis Marie Breakwell. Vice-chancellor, University of Bath. For services to Higher Education.
- Moira Gibb, CBE. Lately Chief Executive, London Borough of Camden and Chair, Social Work Reform Board. For services to Local Government and Social Work.
- Professor Judith Eileen Hill, CBE. Chief Executive, Northern Ireland Hospice. For services to People receiving Palliative Care in Northern Ireland.
- Penelope Margaret Lively, CBE. Author. For services to Literature.
- Julie Moore. Chief Executive, University Hospital Birmingham NHS Foundation Trust. For services to Healthcare.
- Sylvia Morris. Headteacher, The Cathedral School of St Saviour and St Mary Overy, Southwark, London. For services to Education.
- Joan Mary Ruddock, MP. For public and political services.

==== Knight Commander of The Order of the British Empire (KBE) ====
- Jonathan Paul Ive, CBE. Senior Vice-President, Industrial Design, Apple Inc, USA. For services to design and enterprise.
- John Patrick Richardson. Art Historian and Author. For services to art.

==== Commander of the Order of the British Empire (CBE) ====
Military Division

- Captain Paul Abraham, Royal Navy
- Air Commodore Richard John Atkinson, Royal Air Force
- Group Captain Nicholas Bray, Royal Air Force
- Captain Steven Dainton, Royal Navy
- Group Captain John Gladstone, MBE, DFC, Royal Air Force
- Surgeon Rear Admiral Lionel John Jarvis, QHS Royal Navy
- Colonel Andrew Dutton Mason, OBE, British Army, late The Parachute Regiment
- Brigadier Nicola Patricia Moffat, British Army, late Adjutant General's Corps (Staff and Personnel Support Branch)
- Brigadier Richard Edward Nugee, MBE British Army, late Royal Regiment of Artillery
- Brigadier Thomas Norman O'Brien, TD, ADC, DL, British Army, late The Royal Logistic Corps, Territorial Army
- Colonel David Charles Richmond, British Army, late The Royal Regiment of Scotland
- Major General David Anthony Hirst Shaw, British Army, late Royal Regiment of Artillery
- Commodore Robert Joseph Thompson, Royal Navy

Civil Division

- Dr Dannie Abse. Poet and Playwright. For services to Poetry and Literature.
- Professor Mel Ainscow. Professor of Education, University of Manchester. For services to Education.
- Robert Assirati. Lately Director, Major Projects Authority, Cabinet Office.
- Professor Madeleine Julia Atkins. Vice-chancellor, Coventry University. For services to Higher Education.
- Professor Karin Barber. Professor of African Cultural Anthropology, University of Birmingham. For services to African Studies.
- Catherine Elizabeth Bell. Deputy Secretary, Department for Employment and Learning, Northern Ireland Executive.
- Professor Dinesh Kumar Makhan Lai Bhugra. Lately President, Royal College of Psychiatrists, London. For services to Psychiatry.
- Robert William Black. Lately Auditor-General for Scotland.
- Helena Bonham Carter. Actor. For services to Drama.
- Andrew William Brown. Lately Director-General of the Advertising Association. For services to the Advertising Industry.
- Keith Graham Budgen. Lately Regional Director, South East Region, Her Majesty's Courts and Tribunals Service, Ministry of Justice.
- Professor Alan Bundy. Professor of Automated Reasoning, University of Edinburgh. For services to Computing Science.
- Dr Andrew Burnett. Deputy Director, British Museum. For services to the British Museum and Numismatics.
- Anthony Charles Burton. Chair of the Board of the Royal Court Theatre. For services to Theatre.
- Kenneth Caley, TD Chief Crown Prosecutor, Eastern Region, Crown Prosecution Service.
- The Right Honourable The Lord Carlile of Berriew, QC. Independent Reviewer of Terrorism Legislation, United Kingdom. For services to National Security.
- Professor Hilary Anne Chapman. Chief Nurse and chief operating officer, Sheffield Teaching Hospitals NHS Foundation Trust, South Yorkshire. For services to Nursing.
- Charles Giles Clarke. Chair of the England and Wales Cricket Board. For services to Cricket.
- Denise Coates. Founder and Chief Executive bet365. For services to the community and business.
- Ronald Balfour Corbett, OBE. Entertainer. For services to Entertainment and to Charity.
- Professor Jack Crane. State Pathologist, Northern Ireland State Pathologist's Department. For services to Forensic Pathology.
- John Phillip Crawley. Lately chairman, Charter for Business, Toronto, Canada. For services to the Duke of Edinburgh Award Scheme
- Professor Naim Eliahou Dangoor, OBE Philanthropist. For charitable services.
- Edwin Davies, OBE. Philanthropist. For charitable services.
- Ms Marion Clare Davis. Director, Children, Young People and Families Directorate, Warwickshire County Council. For services to Children and Young People.
- Fiona Dawe, OBE Lately chief executive officer, YouthNet. For services to Volunteering.
- Dr Frances Diana Dow. Lately Chair, Marshall Aid Commemoration Commission. For services to UK/USA relations and the Marshall Scholarships
- Rona Fairhead. Chairman and chief executive officer, Financial Times Group. For services to UK Industry.
- Professor Peter Michael Fidler, MBE Vice-chancellor, University of Sunderland. For services to Higher Education.
- David Jonathan Flint. Chief Executive, Oxford Instruments. For services to Business and Science.
- Professor Clare Juliet Fowler. Consultant Uro-Neurologist, University College London Hospitals NHS Foundation Trust. For services to UroNeurology.
- Laurence Stephen Geller. Chairman, Churchill Centre, Chicago. For services to the Churchill Centre and to charitable and humanitarian work internationally
- Dr Gillian Greer, MNZM, Lately Director-General, International Planned Parenthood Federation. For services to International Health and Women's Rights.
- Jean Gross. England's Communication Champion for Children. For services to Education.
- David John Hall. Chairman, Financial Services Compensation Scheme. For services to the Financial Services Industry.
- Ronald Shade Hamilton. Chair, Daysoft Ltd. For services to the Contact Lens Industry.
- Stephen John Hammersley. Chief Executive, Community Foundation Network. For services to Philanthropy.
- Fiona, Lady Hodgson of Astley Abbotts. For services to Gender Equality.
- James Essex Holloway. Director, The Scottish National Portrait Gallery. For services to the Arts
- Charles William Holroyd, DL, Philanthropist. For services to Young People and to the community in the North West.
- Meredydd John Hughes, QPM, Lately Chief Constable, South Yorkshire Police. For services to the Police.
- Jennifer Hutton. Deputy Director, Cabinet Office.
- Dr Bryan Jackson, OBE For services to Manufacturing, the East Midlands Region and the East Midlands Regional Development Agency.
- Clive Vivian Leopold James, AM, Author, Poet and Broadcaster. For services to Literature and the Media.
- Mark Vincent James. Chief Executive, Carmarthenshire County Council. For services to Local Government in Wales.
- Jonathan Jones. Director, Tourism and Marketing, Welsh Government.
- Richard Jones. Director, Adult Social Care, Lancashire County Council. For services to Adult Social Care.
- Steve Lillywhite. Music Producer. For services to Music
- James Lupton. Lately Chairman of Board of Trustees, Dulwich Picture Gallery. For services to the Arts and Philanthropy.
- James Gordon MacKinnon. Director and Chief Planner, Directorate for the Built Environment, Scottish Executive.
- Dr Tahir Ahmed Mahmood. For services to Women's Health.
- Trevor Mann. Senior Vice-President for Manufacturing, Nissan Europe. For services to Business in North East England.
- Professor James Mansell. Emeritus Professor of Learning Disability. For services to People with Intellectual Disabilities.
- Nigel Mansell, OBE, President, UK Youth. For services to Children and Young People.
- Andrew Marles, QFSM Lately chief fire officer, South Wales Fire and Rescue Service. For services to the Fire and Rescue Service.
- Professor Ursula Hilda Mary Martin. Professor of Computer Science and lately Vice-Principal, Queen Mary, University of London. For services to Computer Science.
- John Renwick McAslan. Executive Chair and Founder, John McAslan & Partners. For services to Architecture.
- Professor Seamus McDaid. Principal and Vice-chancellor, University of the West of Scotland. For services to Higher Education.
- Ruby McGregor-Smith. chief executive officer, Mitie. For services to Business and Diversity in Business.
- Martina Milburn. Chief Executive, The Prince's Trust. For services to Charity.
- Helena Louise Morrissey. chief executive officer, Newton Investment Management and Founder of 30% Club. For services to UK Business.
- Dr Robert Frederick Mulder. For services to Philanthropy.
- Professor Eileen Munro. Professor of Social Policy, London School of Economics. For services to Children and Families.
- Marc Andrew Newson. Designer. For services to design in the UK and worldwide
- The Venerable William Noblett. Chaplain-General of Prisons, HM Prison Service, Ministry of Justice.
- Professor Judith Irene Petts. Lately Member of the Royal Commission on Environmental Pollution. For services to Scientific Research.
- Professor David Phillips, OBE, President, Royal Society of Chemistry and Professor of Chemistry, Imperial College London. For services to Chemistry.
- Professor Keith Ridgway, OBE, Research Director, Advanced Manufacturing Research Centre. For services to Manufacturing Research.
- Professor Trevor William Robbins, FRS, FMedSci. Director, Behavioural and Clinical Neuroscience Institute, University of Cambridge. For services to Medical Research.
- Gerald Maurice Ronson. Philanthropist. For charitable services.
- Elizabeth Rushton. Lately Principal and Chief Executive, West Herts College. For services to Further Education.
- Dr Andrew Sentance. Economist. For services to the Economy.
- Howard John Shiplee. Director of Construction, Olympic Delivery Authority. For services to Construction.
- Gordon Smith. Acting Director, Debt Management and Banking, London, HM Revenue and Customs.
- Paul Adrian Smith. Founder and Chair, Celador Entertainment. For services to the Media Industry.
- Professor Sarah Springman, OBE. For services to Triathlon.
- Professor James George Steele. Dean, Newcastle Dental School. For services to Dentistry and Oral Health.
- Ian Stoutzker, OBE. Philanthropist. For services to Music.
- Professor Philip Sutton. Lately Director, Science and Technology Strategy, Ministry of Defence.
- John Raymond Syvret. chief executive officer, Cammell Laird Shiprepairers and Shipbuilders Ltd. For services to the UK Maritime Sector.
- Professor Lionel Tarassenko. Chair of Electrical Engineering, University of Oxford. For services to Engineering.
- Peter Thomas. For services to Entrepreneurship, Sport and Charity in Wales.
- Eileen Thornton. Chair, Education and Training Committee, Health Professions Council. For services to Healthcare Education and Training.
- Vanni Emanuele Treves. Chair, National College for School Leadership. For services to Education.
- Dr Andrew Oliver Tyler. Lately chief operating officer, Defence Equipment and Support, Ministry of Defence.
- Dr Eileen Vizard. Child and Adolescent Psychiatrist. For services to Children and Young People.
- Professor John Wallwork. Professor of Cardiothoracic Surgery and Director of Transplantation, Papworth Hospital, Cambridge. For services to Healthcare.
- James Garwood Michael Wates. Deputy chairman, Wates and chairman, Construction Industry Training Board. For services to Construction and the Charitable Sector.
- Dr Neslyn Eugénie Watson-Druée, MBE. Lately Chair, NHS Kingston. For services to Healthcare.
- Michael Charles Wells. Director, Risk and Intelligence Service, London, HM Revenue and Customs.
- Malcolm Wharton. Principal, Hartpury College, Gloucestershire. For services to Further Education.
- Professor Joan White. Lately Director of the Academy and Dean of the Faculty of Education, Royal Academy of Dance. For services to Dance.
- Malcolm Whitehouse. Lately Deputy chief information officer and Group Applications Director, Department for Work and Pensions.
- Guy Alexander Wilkinson. Lately Archbishop's Secretary for Inter-Religious Affairs and National Inter-Religious Affairs Adviser. For services to Inter-Faith Relations.
- Peter Anthony Winslow. chief executive officer, BGL Group. For services to Financial Services.
- Julia Doris Wood. Lately Deputy Director of Pensions, Cabinet Office.
- Thomas Worsley. Lately Senior Economic Adviser, Department for Transport
- Dr Paul Zollinger-Read. Lately Chief Executive, NHS Cambridgeshire. For services to the NHS

==== Officer of the Order of the British Empire (OBE) ====
Military Division

- Captain Robert Stuart Alexander, Royal Navy
- Commander Simon Phillip Asquith, Royal Navy
- Group Captain Julian David Ball, Royal Air Force
- Colonel Anthony Gareth Bex, British Army, The Royal Logistic Corps
- Lieutenant Colonel Robaird James Boyd, British Army, The Duke of Lancaster's Regiment
- Lieutenant Colonel Jonathan David Bryant, British Army, Army Air Corps
- Colonel Mark Byers, British Army, Royal Army Medical Corps
- Colonel Jane Elizabeth Davis, QVRM, TD, DL, British Army, late Queen Alexandra's Royal Army Nursing Corps, Territorial Army
- Lieutenant Colonel Adam Guy Dawson, MC, British Army, The Parachute Regiment
- Acting Colonel Anthony Ian Denison, British Army, Middlesex and North West London Sector Army Cadet Force
- Lieutenant Colonel Simon David Etherington, British Army, The Royal Anglian Regiment
- Colonel Hugo Murray Fletcher, British Army, late The Parachute Regiment
- Wing Commander Adrian Stewart Frost, Royal Air Force
- Lieutenant Colonel Sebastian Giles Heath, MBE, British Army, Royal Regiment of Artillery
- Wing Commander Brian James, Royal Air Force
- Wing Commander Iain Lunan, Royal Air Force
- Acting Colonel Andrew Grahame MacLean, MBE, British Army, Royal Regiment of Artillery
- Commander Michael Robert James Maltby, Royal Navy
- Lieutenant Colonel Russell Alexander Miller, British Army, Intelligence Corps
- Captain Dean George Molyneaux, Royal Navy
- Commodore John Keith Moores, Royal Navy
- Commander Peter Nicholas Olive, Royal Navy
- Wing Commander Patrick Keiran O'Donnell, Royal Air Force
- Wing Commander Simon Andrew Paterson, Royal Air Force
- Captain Jonathan Patrick Pentreath, Royal Navy
- Colonel Ian Edward Prosser, British Army, late Adjutant General's Corps (Royal Military Police)
- Group Captain Peter James Murray Squires, Royal Air Force

Civil Division

- Mrs Isobel Frances Abulhoul. For services to education and British literature in the United Arab Emirates.
- Paul Edward Adamson, Editor-in-Chief and publisher, E!Sharp, Brussels. For services to promoting the European Union.
- Remi Adefarasin, Cinematographer. For services to Television and Film.
- Zahoor Ahmed, Chairman, Gifts International. For services to International Trade.
- Ms Pamela Elizabeth Alexander, Lately Chief Executive, South East England Development Agency. For services to Regeneration.
- David James Allen, Registrar and Deputy Chief Executive, University of Exeter. For services to Higher Education.
- Mrs Durdana Ansari. For services to Muslim Women in the UK.
- David James Ashman. For voluntary service to SSAFA. Forces Help.
- Dr Richard William Barker, Former Director General, Association of the British Pharmaceutical Industry. For services to the Pharmaceutical Industry.
- Willy Bauer, Hotelier. For services to the Hospitality Industry.
- Dr Andrew Baxter, Grade B2, Ministry of Defence.
- Thomas James Beattie. For services to Children's Healthcare in Scotland.
- Stephen Bell, Chief Executive, Cyrenians. For services to Homeless People.
- Gideon Samuel Ben-Tovim, Chair, Liverpool NHS Primary Care Trust. For services to Health.
- Professor Dianne Claire Berry, Professor of Psychology, University of Reading. For services to Scientific Research.
- David William Best, Director of Finance and Support Services, Police Service of Northern Ireland. For services to Policing.
- Paul Bidwell, Archaeologist. For services to Heritage.
- Roger Freeland Biggs, chief executive officer, International Resources for the Improvement of Sight (IRIS). For services to health in Asia.
- Lady Rachel Mary Billington, Author and Vice-President, English PEN. For services to Literature.
- Harold Dennis Bird, MBE. For services to Cricket and to Charity.
- Dr Ian Birnbaum, Lately, Strategic Director, Children, Young People and Learning Services, London Borough of Sutton. For services to Local Government.
- Charles Blundell, Strategic Government and International Affairs Adviser, Rolls-Royce plc. For services to Industry.
- Fleur Bothwick, Director of Diversity and Inclusion, Ernst & Young. For services to diversity and inclusion in the workplace.
- Andrew Patrick Keith Boyle, Chairman, Road Haulage Association. For services to the Transport Industry.
- Professor Celia Brackenridge. For services to Equality and Child Protection in Sport.
- Vincent Brady, Lately Deputy Director, Department for Communities and Local Government.
- Andrew Richard Dingley Brown, Executive Vice-President, Shell. For services to UK/Qatar business relations.
- Jonathan Browning, Stabilisation Adviser, Helmand Province. For public service.
- Neil Alexander Bruce, Executive Director and chief operating officer, AMEC. For services to Engineering.
- Richard Brunwin, Lately chief executive officer, Sir Oswald Stoll Foundation. For services to ex-Service Men and Women.
- Mrs Melanie Bryan, Founder, WhyNotChange. For services to Social Enterprise and Women's Enterprise in North West England.
- Professor Peter Jennings Buckley, Professor of International Business, University of Leeds. For services to Higher Education, International Business and Research.
- Peter Bucks, non-executive director and Chair of Audit Committee, Ofwat. For services to Regulation.
- Councillor Mark Burns-Williamson, Member, Wakefield Metropolitan District Council and West Yorkshire Police Authority. For services to the community in Castleford, West Yorkshire.
- Dr Arthur Terrence David Butland, Deputy Vice-chancellor, Middlesex University. For services to Higher Education.
- Mrs Sheena Catherine Byrom, Consultant Midwife, East Lancashire Hospitals NHS Trust. For services to Nursing.
- Orin Cadogan-Lewis, Co-Founder and Chief Executive, African Caribbean Leukaemia Trust. For services to Healthcare.
- Brian Adam Hugh Callaghan, Chairman, Callaghan Group, Gibraltar. For services to chess and tourism in Gibraltar.
- Mrs Mary Antoinette Campbell, Lately Principal, Michaelston Community College. For services to Education.
- Dr Rachel Carr, chief executive officer and co-Founder, IntoUniversity. For services to Education.
- Alan Caton, Detective Superintendent, Suffolk Constabulary. For services to the Police.
- Neil Caves, Prison Capacity Programme Manager, Ministry of Justice.
- Mrs Barbara Evelyn Challinger, Headteacher, Haslingden High School, Lancashire. For services to Education.
- Richard Wedlake Chambers, Lately Principal, Lambeth College. For services to Further Education.
- Professor Ruth Margaret Chambers, General Practitioner, Tunstall, Stoke-on-Trent. For services to Primary Care.
- Councillor Michael Chater, Lately chairman, National Association of Local Councils. For services to Local Government.
- Clive Christian, Designer. For services to the Luxury Goods Industry.
- John Newling Cloake, First Secretary, Foreign & Commonwealth Office.
- Darren Christopher Clarke. For services to Golf.
- Mrs Margaret Alexandra Clarke, Chair, 11 September UK Families Support Group. For services to Bereaved Families.
- Dr Carl Iwan Clowes. For services to the community in Anglesey.
- John Richard Cockwell, Lately Member, Legislative Assembly, Falkland Islands. For services to promoting the interests of the Falkland Islands.
- Peter Gerald Collinge, Chairman, Andrew Collinge Hairdressing. For services to the Hairdressing Industry.
- Andrew Edward Colver, Head of Democratic Services, Rushmoor Borough Council. For services to Local Government.
- Mrs Josephine Lilian Connell, DL, Vice-President, Age UK. For services to Older People.
- Ms Joyce Cook, Chair, Level Playing Field. For services to Disability Sports.
- Dr Alan John Cooper, Higher Technologist, Audio Visual Evidential Analysis, Metropolitan Police Service. For services to the Police.
- Professor Julian Marc Cooper, Professor, Russian Economic Studies, University of Birmingham. For services to Soviet and Russian economic studies.
- Professor Rachel Cooper, Director, Lancaster Institute for the Contemporary Arts and Professor of Design Management, University of Lancaster. For services to Education.
- The Reverend Ronald Geoffrey Corp, Founder and Artistic Director of the New London Orchestra. For services to Music.
- David Cotterill, MBE, Grade B2, Ministry of Defence.
- Mrs Trudy Anne Couchman, Grade B1, Ministry of Defence.
- Ms Alex Christine Crawford, Special Correspondent, Sky News. For services to Broadcast Journalism.
- Martyn Cribb, City Challenge Adviser for the Black Country. For services to Education.
- David Robert Croll, Principal and Chief Executive, Derby College. For services to Further Education.
- Roy John Crouch, Lately Whitehall Streetscape Project Manager, Cabinet Office.
- Mrs Nina Curley, Head, Private Office Correspondence Team, Department for Education.
- Robert John Dale, First Secretary, Foreign and Commonwealth Office.
- Mrs Samantha Louise Darby, Policy Adviser, Domestic Violence, Home Office.
- Marcus Davey, Chief Executive and Artistic Director, The Roundhouse. For services to Drama.
- Lieutenant Colonel Anthony James Davies, MBE, Lately Chief Executive, Union Jack Club and Chair, South Atlantic Medal Association. For services to the Armed Forces.
- Hugh Davies, Legal Adviser, Child Exploitation and Online Protection Centre. For services to Children and Young People.
- Patrick James Davies, Head of Near East and North Africa Department, Foreign and Commonwealth Office.
- Gavin Davis, Lately Political Officer, Helmand Provincial Reconstruction Team, Department for International Development.
- Geoffrey Mackenzie Davison, President, BREAK. For services to Children.
- William Wilson Dennison, chief executive officer, DennisonCommercials Ltd. For services to Economic Development and to the community in Northern Ireland.
- George Derbyshire, Lately Chief Executive, National Federation of Enterprise Agencies. For services to Enterprise.
- Mrs Amanda Jane Derrick, Programme Director, Connect Digitally Programme, Department for Education. For services to Children and Families.
- Dr Alan Diamond, Philanthropist. For voluntary and public service.
- Mrs Janet Ann Digby-Baker, Chief Executive, Time for Children Fostering Agency. For services to Children and Families.
- James Dobson, managing director, Dunbia. For services to Business in Northern Ireland.
- Dr Paul Charles Dominic Doherty, Lately Headteacher, Trinity Catholic High School, Redbridge, London. For services to Education.
- Martin Richard Douglas, general manager, Cargill UK. For services to Industry in the North West.
- Nigel Antony Eastaway, Tax Partner, BDO International. For services to Taxation Law.
- James Ian Elder-Woodward, Convener, Independent Living in Scotland Steering Group. For services to Equality and Human Rights for Disabled People.
- Professor Mohamed El-Gomati, Professor of Electronics, University of York. For services to Science.
- Dr David Ellis, Lately First Secretary, Tokyo, Japan.
- Helen Elizabeth Ellis, Publicist. For services to Publishing.
- Councillor Hugh Hesketh Evans, Leader, Denbighshire County Council. For services to Local Government.
- Miss Julia Farron (Mrs Joyce Rodrigues), Ballet Dancer and Teacher. For services to Ballet.
- Lester Firkins, Chairman, James Lind Alliance, Strategy and Development. For services to Medical Research.
- Ms Bridget Mary Fisher, President, Chartered Institute of Library and Information Professionals. For services to Libraries.
- Mrs Tamara Flanagan, Director of European and Statutory Funding, Community Service Volunteers. For services to the Voluntary and Community Sector.
- Gordon Ford, Lately Director of Education and Deputy Chief Executive, West Lothian Council. For services to Education.
- James Stephen Foster, Head of Corporate Real Estate and Sourcing, EMEA. JP Morgan Chase. For services to the Financial Services Industry in Northern Ireland.
- Ms June Elizabeth Foster, Headteacher, Moorside Community Primary School and the Arthur's Hill Federation, Newcastle upon Tyne. For services to Education.
- Professor Thomas Howard Exton Foulkes, Lately Director General, Institution of Civil Engineers. For services to Engineering.
- Dr Martin John Francis Fowler, Grade B2, Ministry of Defence.
- Dr David Harry France, Founder, Everton Former Players' Foundation. For services to football in the UK and Europe.
- Mrs Sarita Violeta Francis, Deputy Governor, Montserrat.
- Dr Eleanor Anne Freeman, Consultant in Geriatric Medicine, Royal Gwent Hospital. For services to Stroke Medicine and Medical Education in Wales.
- Ms Lynn Garvie, Lately Head of Procurement, the Scottish Parliament.
- Dr Maggie Mary Gee, Author. For services to Literature.
- David Alexander Gibson, Senior Lecturer, Enterprise Education, Queen's University Belfast. For services to Higher Education in Northern Ireland.
- Jon Gifford, President, National Coastwatch Institute. For services to Maritime Safety.
- Ms Fionna Mary Macgregor Gibb, Deputy Head of Mission, Sana'a, Republic of Yemen.
- Mrs Leigh Gibson, Director, British Council.
- Mrs Christine Mary Gillie, Head Social Policy Section, House of Commons.
- Peter Murray Charles Gimber, Road Safety Manager, Devon County Council. For services to Local Government.
- Andrew Richard Glass, Lately Director, British Council, Serbia and Montenegro.
- Ms Deborah Glass, Deputy Chair, Independent Police Complaints Commission. For services to Law and Order.
- Professor Jean Golding, Emeritus Professor of Paediatric and Perinatal Epidemiology, University of Bristol. For services to Medical Science.
- Paul Gould, Executive Head Chef, NEC. Group, Birmingham. For services to Hospitality.
- Peter Russell Grace, Founder of Ascot Park Polo Club. For services to Polo.
- Dr Richard John Graham, Grade J2, Department for Business, Innovation and Skills.
- James Grazebrook, Entrepreneur. For services to the UK Marine Industry.
- Mrs Anita Green., Vice Chair, Board of Trustees, National Society for the Prevention of Cruelty to Children. For services to Children.
- Martyn Greenaway. For public service.
- Winston James Griffith, Chair, Abertawe Bro Morgannwg University Health Board. For services to the NHS in Wales.
- William Alexander Murray Grigor, Film-Maker. For services to Architecture and to the Film Industry.
- Mrs June Guinness, Head of Policy, Forensic Science Regulation Unit, Home Office.
- Mohammad Habeebullah, JP. For services to the community in Greater Manchester.
- Mrs Christine Haddock, Headteacher, Larkspur Community Primary School, Gateshead. For services to Education.
- Christopher Sandford Hall, TD DL, Chairman, World Horse Welfare. For services to Equine Welfare.
- James Stuart Hall, Sports Broadcaster. For services to Broadcasting and Charity.
- Jonathan Lewis Hall, Lately Senior Representative, Helmand Province, Department for International Development.
- Mrs Susan Harding, Lately Programme Manager, Change Programme, Department for Work and Pensions.
- Ms Anne Shirley Harrison, Head of Specialist Operational Support, National Policing Improvement Agency. For services to Public Protection.
- Professor Stuart Haszeldine, Professor of Geology, University of Edinburgh. For services to Climate Change Technologies.
- Raymond Lazare Hazan, President, St Dunstan's. For services to Blind Ex-Service Men and Women.
- Mrs Leanne Hedden, Lately Executive Director for Supporting Delivery, Training and Development Agency for Schools, Department for Education.
- Dr Lesley Hewson, Lately Chair, National Advisory Council for Children's Mental Health and Psychological Wellbeing. For services to Children.
- Ms Irma Verslyn Heyliger, Chair, Leeds Black Achievers Wings Award. For services to Black and Minority Ethnic people in Leeds, West Yorkshire.
- Mrs Felicity Mary Hilder. Founder, Lymphoma Association. For charitable services.
- Robin Mackenzie Hodge, Publisher, The List. For services to Arts and Culture.
- Dr Eva Naomi Ailene Hodgson, Teacher. For services to community interests in Bermuda.
- Dr Christopher John Howard, Headteacher, Lewis School, Pengam, Caerphilly. For services to Education.
- Mrs Elizabeth Howell, Chief Executive, Compaid Trust. For services to the Voluntary Sector in South East England.
- Dr Deirdre Hughes, Lead Consultant, Quality Assurance and Evidence Base at European Lifelong Guidance Policy Network. For services to Career Guidance.
- Ms Barbara Hulanicki, Founder, Biba. For services to the Fashion Industry.
- Mrs Catherine Diana Hurst, Principal, Wigan and Leigh College. For services to Further Education.
- Christopher Inman, Honorary Treasurer, British Fashion Council. For services to the Fashion Industry.
- Grenville Jackson, Lately Deputy Director, Skills, Higher Education and Lifelong Learning, Welsh Assembly Government.
- Dr Michael Thomas Jackson, Lately International Rice Research Institute, the Philippines. For services to international food science.
- Mrs Fiona Jeffery, Chair, World Travel Market. For services to the Tourism Industry.
- Gareth Richard Jones. For public service.
- Professor Robert Owen Jones, Monitor, Welsh Language Project in Patagonia. For services to safeguarding the Welsh language in Argentina.
- Anthony Paul Kay, Consular Regional Director for the Middle East, Foreign and Commonwealth Office.
- David Kay, Chairman, International Fire and Rescue Association. For services to Fire Prevention and Rescue.
- Ms Lorraine Kelly. For services to Charity and the Armed Forces.
- Dr Stephen Robert Kennett, Lately Regional Director, Government Office for the West Midlands, Department for Communities and Local Government.
- Dr Alan Kerbey. For services to Medical Research, Education and to Young People.
- Mrs Sandra Kerr, National Director, Race for Opportunity, Business in the Community. For services to Black and Minority Ethnic People.
- Andrew Kidd, Deputy Head, Kabul Office, Department for International Development.
- Dr James Patrick Kingsland., General Practitioner and President, National Association of Primary Care, Wirral, Merseyside. For services to General Practice.
- Professor Peter Charles Russell Latchford. For services to Business and to the community in the West Midlands.
- Peter Latham, Chairman, James Latham plc. For services to the Wood Industry.
- Miss Elizabeth Jean Laughton, Second Secretary, Foreign and Commonwealth Office.
- John Albert Thomas Lee. For services to the Rural Economy.
- Matthew Lewis, First Secretary, Foreign and Commonwealth Office.
- Mrs Margaret Liddy, Director of Events and Charities, British Phonographic Industry. For services to the Music Industry and Charity.
- Mrs Diana Linskey, Lately Deputy Director, Department for Environment, Food and Rural Affairs.
- Charles Richard Lister, Greyhound Trainer. For services to Greyhound Racing.
- Jack Livingstone, Philanthropist. For charitable services in Greater Manchester.
- Charles Brooke Longbottom. For public and charitable services.
- Professor Niall Lothian, Adjunct Professor, INSEAD. For services to Corporate and Civic Governance in Scotland.
- Ms Julie Anne Luther, Clinical Director, HMP Frankland, Ministry of Justice.
- Ms Catrin Myfanwy Maby, chief executive officer, Severn Wye Energy Agency. For services to the Environment and to Social Equity.
- Fiona Jane Macgregor, Head of Affordable Housing, Homes and Communities Agency. For services to Housing.
- Gordon Alexander Mackinlay, President of the British Association of Paediatric Surgeons. For services to Paediatric Surgery.
- Mrs Sylvia Maharaj, Chair of Licensing Committee, Waltham Forest Magistrates' Court. For services to the Administration of Justice.
- Mrs Christine Margaret Manby, Senior Instructor and Deputy Organiser for South Yorkshire, Women's Royal Voluntary Service. For services to the Voluntary Sector.
- Graham Manly, Business Development Director, Gratte Brothers Ltd. For services to the Building Services Sector.
- William Edward Mann, Lately Headteacher, St Hilary School, St Hilary, Penzance, Cornwall. For services to Education.
- Patrick Mars,. Head of Employee Relations, Diversity and Equality, UK Border Agency, Home Office.
- David Dunbar Mawhinney, managing director, Equiniti-ICS. For services to the Information and Communications Technology Industry in Northern Ireland.
- Amin Mohamed Mawji. For public and voluntary service.
- Mrs Fionnuala McAndrew, Director of Children and Executive Director for Social Work, Health and Social Care Board. For services to Healthcare in Northern Ireland.
- Ms Fiona McCoy, Ministerial Private Secretary, Northern Ireland Office.
- Graham Alexander Stuart McCulloch. MBE, Head, Teaching Operations, British Council.
- John McCrory, Member, Capital for Enterprise Advisory Board. For Services to the Venture Capital Market.
- Mrs Anne McFadden, Headteacher, St Mirin's Primary School, Glasgow. For services to Education.
- Donald McGougan, Lately Director of Finance, City of Edinburgh Council. For services to Local Government.
- Professor James Andrew McLaughlin, Professor, Advanced Functional Materials, University of Ulster. For services to Research and Economic Development in Northern Ireland.
- Dr Ian Gordon McPherson, Clinical Psychologist and director, National Institute for Mental Health. For services to Mental Health.
- Mrs Kathleen McQuillan, Lately vice-chair, Parole Board for Scotland. For services to Justice.
- Mrs Mary Veronica Mead, Owner, Holt Farms Ltd and co-Founder, Yeo Valley. For services to Sustainable Dairy Farming.
- Keith Milburn, Head of Court Business Delivery, Crown Prosecution Service.
- Charles Miller, Proprietor, Charlie Miller Hairdressing Limited. For services to the Hairdressing Industry.
- Miss Susan Brenda Mills, International Relief and Development Worker, Tearfund. For services to International Development and Disaster Response.
- Mrs Jacqueline Kathleen Mina, Goldsmith and Jeweller. For services to Art.
- Dr Andrew John Minchener, Consultant. For services to international science and clean energy collaboration with China.
- Mrs Eileen Monks, Director, Isle of Wight Youth Trust. For services to Young People.
- Mrs Linda Moore, Group Director and Vice-Principal, Newcastle College. For services to Further Education.
- Professor Frank Morgan, Vice-chancellor, Bath Spa University. For services to Higher Education.
- Mrs Mary Patricia Morgan, Community Nurse, Nottingham. For Maureen services to Primary and Community Nursing.
- Mrs Shelagh Morris, Allied Health Professions Officer and Occupational Therapist, Department of Health.
- Dr Anne Patricia Murdoch, Principal, Newbury College, Berkshire. For services to Further Education.
- Adrian Newey, chief technical officer, Red Bull. For services to Motorsport.
- Dr Frank Antony Newton. For services to Sailing.
- Christopher Paul O'Connor, HM Ambassador, Tunis, Tunisia.
- Professor Derek Clive Offord, Lately Professor, Russian Studies, University of Bristol. For services to Russian studies in language and culture.
- Wilfred John Orr, Minister, Newtownbreda Presbyterian Church. For services to the community in Northern Ireland.
- Mrs Margaret Ann Paren, Chair, South Downs National Park Authority. For services to the Environment.
- Ms Hayley Parsons, Founder and Chief Executive, Gocompare.com. For services to the Economy.
- Robert Parsons, Founder and Lately Executive Chairman of Care for the Family. For services to Family Support.
- Andrew Geoffrey Payne. For services to the UK Computer Games Industry.
- Nicholas Milne Payne. For services to the Arts and Heritage in the North West.
- Christopher Mark Pemberton, Director of National Collections, English Heritage. For services to Heritage.
- Dr David Charles Pencheon, Director, National NHS Sustainability Unit, East of England Strategic Health Authority, Cambridgeshire. For services to Public Health and the NHS.
- Mrs Susan Joyce Pentecost, Head of Resources Division, UK Export Finance, Export Credits Guarantee Department, Department for Business, Innovation and Skills.
- Dr Laura Gay Pollard, Campaign Manager, Risk and Intelligence Directorate, Shipley, HM Revenue and Customs.
- David Wilson Posnett, Chairman of Trustees, Holburne Museum, Bath. For services to Museums.
- Christopher Preddie. For services to Young People in London.
- Desmond George Michael Prichard, QFSM, chief fire officer, East Sussex Fire and Rescue Service. For services to Local Government.
- Roger Ernest Pugh, Team Leader, Stakeholder Team, Communications, Department for Work and Pensions.
- Ms Alice Jane Kelly Purnell. For services to Transgender People.
- Colin Clifford Pyrah, Special Projects Director, Paragon Creative. For services to the UK Heritage Industry.
- Miss Shelagh Rosemary Rainey, Chair, Belfast Education and Library Board. For services to Education in Northern Ireland.
- Ms Susan Ratchford, Chair, Northwards Housing. For services to Local Government in North Manchester.
- William Rathbone, Philanthropist. For charitable services.
- Ian Reid, Chief Executive, Scottish Sports Futures. For services to Young People in Scotland.
- John Graham Richardson. For public service.
- Augustus Beverley Walter Risman. For services to Rugby league.
- Professor Ella Ritchie, Deputy Vice-chancellor, Newcastle University. For services to Higher Education.
- Mark Rodaway, Rescue Coordination Centre Manager, HM Coastguard Portland, Maritime and Coastguard Agency, Department for Transport.
- Arthur John Row, Deputy Pension Centre Manager, International Pension Centre, Pension, Disability and Carers Service, Department for Work and Pensions.
- Dr Susan Sanderson, Chair, Executive Board of the British Dental Association, London. For services to Dentistry.
- Jeremy Giovanni Sargent, Partner, JS Associates, Guangzhou, China. For services to UK business and legal services in China.
- Jehangir Sarosh, President Emeritus, European Chapter, World Council on Religions for Peace. For Services to Inter-Faith Relations.
- William Sadler Scott, Head of Unit, Blood and Transplant Division, Health and Social Care Directorate, Scottish Executive.
- Miss Amanda Sharp, Co-Founder, Frieze Art Fair. For services to the Visual Arts.
- Christopher Thomas Sharratt, Lately Chief Executive, Sheffield Children's NHS Foundation Trust. For services to Child Health.
- The Reverend William Alexander Shaw, Director, 174 Trust. For services to the community in North Belfast.
- Michael Stuart Shearer, Deputy High Commissioner, Freetown, Sierra Leone.
- Dr John Edward Sheehy, Lately International Rice Research Institute, the Philippines. For services to agricultural research and development.
- Dr Shirley Angela Sherwood, Botanical Art Curator. For services to Botanical Art.
- Mrs Lydia Emelda Simmons. For services to the community in Slough, Berkshire.
- Professor Stephen James Singleton, Medical Director and Regional Director of Public Health, NHS North East, Newcastle upon Tyne. For services to Public Health.
- Mrs Lynn Slinger, Headteacher of Forest Way Special School, Coalville, Leicestershire. For services to Education.
- Matthew Slotover, Co-Founder, Frieze Art Fair. For services to the Visual Arts.
- Mrs Ronwen Smith, Lately Headteacher, Linden Bridge School, Surrey. For services to Special Needs Education.
- John Whitham Stafford, Chief Executive, Merseyside Probation Trust. For services to Ex-Offenders.
- Dr John Frederick Stageman, Vice-President, UK Science Affairs, Astra Zeneca. For services to the UK Biotechnology Industry.
- Ms Louise Jane Stanton, High Commissioner, Malta.
- Janette Steel, Headteacher of Chelsea Children's Hospital School. For services to Education.
- Dr Miranda Stevenson, Director, British and Irish Association of Zoos and Aquariums. For services to Wildlife Conservation.
- Dr Moira Connell Stewart, Consultant Paediatrician. For services to Healthcare in Northern Ireland.
- Thomas Jonathan Stoddart, QPM, Chief Constable, Durham Constabulary. For services to the Police.
- Roderick Guy Stone, Deputy Co-ordinator, Specialist Investigations, Missing Trader Intra-Community, London, HM Revenue and Customs.
- Ms Joanne Stuart, Director, Attrus Ltd and former chairman, Institute of Directors, Northern Ireland Division. For services to Business in the community.
- Ian Richard Sumnall, Chief Executive, Arun District Council. For services to Local Government.
- Miss June Taylor, Chairman, Independent Schools Inspectorate. For services to Education.
- Mrs Amanda Thompson, managing director, Blackpool Pleasure Beach. For services to the Leisure Park Industry.
- Ms Victoria Thornton, Founder Open-City. For services to Architecture.
- Ms Anne Lesley Tipple, National Skills Development Executive, British Chambers of Commerce. For services to Business Skills Development.
- Steven Gregory Tuft, Lately Headteacher, The Pines School, Birmingham. For services to Education.
- Ms Linda Hamilton Urquhart, Chairman, Morton Fraser LLP. For services to Business in Scotland.
- Miss Emma Lesley Wade, Lately Head of Crisis Group, Foreign and Commonwealth Office.
- Kefin Lloyd Wakefield, Head of Economic Development, Pembrokeshire County Council. For services to Local Government.
- Timothy Roy Wakeman, Chair and Chief Executive, Performance Timber Products Group. For services to the Joinery Manufacturing Industry.
- Gregory Alec Walker, Chief Executive, CREATE. For services to Unemployed People.
- Douglas Norman Walters, Head, Government Legal Service Secretariat, Treasury Solicitor's Department.
- Raymond William Warburton, Senior Team Leader, NHS Equality Team, Department of Health.
- Grant Stephen Watson, Lately Chair of Newport Unlimited. For services to Regeneration in Newport, South Wales.
- Dr Michael Leonard Watson, Director of Medicine, NHS Education for Scotland. For services to Postgraduate Medical Education.
- Philip Arthur George Watts, Head of Corporate Office, Ordnance Survey, Department for Business, Innovation and Skills.
- Ms Sarah Jane St Clair Weir. For services to the Arts.
- Paul Anthony Whitbourn, Head of ALB. Transition Programme, EU/International Cross Border Health and Competition Policy, Department of Health.
- Gerald Barry Macintosh Williams, Chairman, Friends of Bedgebury Pinetum. For services to the Environment.
- Andrew Godfrey Williamson, chief operating officer, The Football League. For services to Football.
- Charles Moore Wilson, Trustee, Hertford British Hospital Corporation. For services to the British community in Paris.
- Professor Diana Woodhouse, Lately Pro Vice-chancellor Research, Oxford Brookes University. For services to Legal Scholarship and Higher Education.
- Ms Lilian Hermione Youngs, Senior Adviser, Programmes, Ministry of Rural Rehabilitation and Development, Afghanistan. For services to development in Afghanistan.

==== Members of the Order of the British Empire (MBE) ====
Military Division

- Warrant Officer Class 2 Paul Richard Addenbrooke, British Army, Coldstream Guards
- Major Toby Paul Barnes-Taylor, British Army, Grenadier Guards
- Squadron Leader Mark John Beardmore, Royal Air Force
- Squadron Leader Mark Edward Biggadike, Royal Air Force
- Warrant Officer 1 (Abovewater Warfare Tactical) Gerard Maurice Burns, Royal Navy Warfare Specialist
- Major Richard Mark Coates, British Army, The Royal Regiment of Fusiliers
- Warrant Officer Russell Jeremy Coppack, Royal Air Force
- Squadron Leader Graem Michael Corfield, Royal Air Force
- Captain Victoria Anne Greer (née Currie), British Army, Intelligence Corps
- Captain John Barrie Elms, British Army, The Mercian Regiment
- chief petty officerCoxswain (Submarines) Martin Farr, Royal Navy
- Lieutenant Colonel Andrew William Field, British Army, The Mercian Regiment
- Squadron Leader Christopher John Ford, Royal Air Force
- Warrant Officer Class 2 Antony Edward Gaul, British Army, Royal Army Physical Training Corps
- Warrant Officer Class 2 Barry John Grass, British Army, Adjutant General's Corps (Royal Military Police)
- Squadron Leader Michael David Hale, Royal Air Force
- Captain David Brian Hall, British Army, The Duke of Lancaster's Regiment, Territorial Army
- Major John Anthony Harker, British Army, The Duke of Lancaster's Regiment
- Captain Steven John Harris, British Army, The Rifles
- Major Andrew Hawkins, QGM, British Army, The Royal Logistic Corps
- Lieutenant Commander Lee Hazard, Royal Navy
- Squadron Leader Neil Hope, Royal Air Force
- Squadron Leader Terence Jeffrey Horsley, Royal Air Force, RAF Volunteer Reserve (Training)
- Warrant Officer Nicola Vincenza Hutchinson, Royal Air Force
- Warrant Officer Brent Thomas Inglis, Royal Air Force
- Acting Lieutenant Colonel Andrew Francis Reaveley James, British Army, Grenadier Guards
- Lieutenant Colonel Marc Stephen Lawson, British Army, Adjutant General's Corps (Staff and Personnel Support Branch)
- Lieutenant Commander Andrew Michael Leaver, Royal Navy
- Lieutenant Colonel Russell Lee, British Army, Royal Regiment of Artillery
- Squadron Leader Joanne Louise Lincoln, Royal Air Force
- Major Mark Martin, British Army, Royal Regiment of Artillery
- Lieutenant Commander Mandy Sheila McBain, Royal Navy
- Major Clive Ronald Alfred Miles, British Army, The Royal Regiment of Scotland
- Lieutenant Commander Stuart Charles William Millen, Royal Navy
- Corporal Lee Mullen, British Army, Corps of Royal Engineers
- Flight Sergeant Simon John Norris, Royal Air Force
- Squadron Leader Michael George Oxford, QCVS, Royal Air Force
- Warrant Officer 1 (Abovewater Warfare Tactical) Nicholas Payne, Royal Navy Warfare Specialist
- Master Aircrewman Dean William Edward Penlington, Royal Air Force
- Acting Lieutenant Colonel Richard Joseph Rearden, Royal Marines
- Lieutenant Colonel Richard John Sydney Reid, TD, British Army, Royal Army Medical Corps
- Acting Lieutenant Colonel Peter John Rowell, British Army, Corps of Royal Engineers
- Major Thomas James Salberg, British Army, Corps of Royal Engineers
- Major Fiona Jane Scotter, British Army, Corps of Royal Engineers
- Squadron Leader Gerard Jeffery Sheppeck, Royal Air Force
- Captain Makand Singh, British Army, The Royal Logistic Corps Territorial Army
- Major Derek Bryan Stafford, Royal Marines
- Corporal Kevin Phillip Thompson, British Army, Corps of Royal Engineers
- Warrant Officer 2 Robert Toomey, Royal Marines
- Major Edward James Trowbridge, British Army, Adjutant General's Corps (Educational and Training Services Branch)
- Warrant Officer Class 2 Neil Wilson Walton, British Army, The Royal Logistic Corps Territorial Army
- Major Steven Gilbert Wemyss, British Army, The Royal Regiment of Scotland
- Commander Noel John Wheatley, Royal Navy Reserve (Sea Cadet Corps)
- Warrant Officer Class 2 Matthew Whitfield, British Army, Royal Corps of Signals
- Lieutenant Colonel Sheldon Wild, BEM, British Army, The King's Royal Hussars
- Colour Sergeant Matthew John Wilkinson, Royal Marines
- Major Dean Ashley Williams, Royal Marines
- Squadron Leader Paula Simone Willmot, Royal Air Force
- Lieutenant Commander Richard Hugh Witte, Royal Marines
- Warrant Officer Class 2 Andrew Gordon Wooton, British Army, Corps of Royal Engineers

Civil Division

- Dr Syed Nayyer Abbas Abidi. For services to the Black and Minority Ethnic community.
- Dr Anthony Acland. Director, AimHigher Hampshire and Isle of Wight Partnership. For services to Higher Education.
- Ms Kate Adams. Co-Founder Project Art Works. For services to Art and Disability.
- Mrs Maureen Adams. Founder, Regional HIV/AIDS service. For services to people affected by HIV/AIDS.
- Mohammed Akram, JP. For services to the British Pakistani community in Scotland.
- Mrs Jill Alexander. For services to the community in Dulwich, London Borough of Southwark.
- Mrs Janet Allan. For services to Heritage in the North West.
- Derek John Alldritt. Senior Executive Officer, Child Maintenance and Enforcement Commission, Department for Work and Pensions.
- Robert James Allen. For services to Ex-Service Men and Women in Leicestershire and Rutland and to the community in Belton-in-Rutland.
- Ralph Allwood. Lately Precentor and Director of Music at Eton College. For services to Choral Music.
- Mrs Esther Robina Yvette Anderson. Musical Director, Police Service of Northern Ireland Ladies Choir. For services to Music and to the community.
- Mrs Isobel Anderson. Chair, Carers Scotland Advisory Committee. For services to the community in Dundee.
- Ms Judith Mary Apiafi. Education Manager of Positive Action through Learning Support. For services to Offender Education.
- Ms Margaret Mary Appleton. For services to Museums and Heritage.
- Paul Charles Arnold. Senior Project Manager, Highways Agency, Department for Transport.
- Geoffrey Thomas Leslie Ashe. Historian. For services to Heritage.
- Miss Kirsty Ann Ashton. Fundraiser, When You Wish Upon a Star Charity. For services to Children and Families.
- Ms Annoushka Ayton. (Annoushka Ducas). Jeweller. For services to the Jewellery Industry.
- John Ayton. Jeweller. For services to the Jewellery Industry.
- Carl Bailey. Governor F, HM Prison Styal, Ministry of Justice.
- Donald Ramsay Bailey. For charitable service.
- Mrs Margaret Baker. For services to GirlGuiding and to the community in Littlehampton, West Sussex.
- Michael George Baker. For services to the community in Huntingdon, Cambridgeshire.
- Thomas Francis Baker. Founder of The Hopton Castle Preservation Trust. For services to Heritage.
- Nicholas Roger Balmforth. For services to Children's Play Provision.
- Vernon Bamber. Immigration Liaison Manager, British Embassy, Cairo, UKBA. Home Office.
- Miss Wendy Barber. Administrator, Institute of Education, University of London. For services to Higher Education.
- John Hamish Barclay. Second Secretary, Kuwait.
- Dr Gerry Barnes. Head of Environment, Norfolk County Council. For services to Forestry and the community.
- Anant Barodekar. Founder of Club 25 for Young People. For services to Young People.
- Paul Baron. Charity worker. For services to vulnerable children overseas.
- Edward William Barry, QPM. For services to charity and the community.
- Kulvinder Bassi. Community Rail Team Leader, Department for Transport.
- Mrs Monique Avril Bateman-Smith. Director, Royal Navy and Royal Marines Children's Fund. For services to Naval families.
- Mrs Margaret Bates. Lately Senior Executive Officer, Jobcentre Plus, Department for Work and Pensions.
- Mrs Audrey Beall. For voluntary service to East Dorset and New Forest branch of the Motor Neurone Disease Association.
- Miss Ida Daphine Bell. Chairman, TALK, Surrey. For services to Stroke Survivors.
- James Christian Bend. Vice-Consul, Osaka, Japan.
- Mrs Elizabeth Bennett. For charitable services in Scotland.
- Mrs Linda Mary Irene Bennett. Operational Line Manager, Reading Valuation Office, HM Revenue and Customs.
- Mrs Barbara Benson-Smith. For services to Dance and to Charity in Whitby, North Yorkshire.
- Miss Dorothy Margaret Best. Physical Education Teacher and School Sports Volunteer, County Durham. For services to Physical Education.
- Mark Bew. Board Director, URS Scott Wilson (Worldwide). For services to the Construction Sector.
- Simon Harry Ryland Bewlay. Chairman, Board of Governors, British School of Manila. For services to education in the Philippines.
- Councillor Mohammad Bhatti. For services to Local Government and to the community.
- David Christopher Bill. For services to Local Government.
- Miss Mary Bingham. For public service.
- Mrs Prudence Mariabella Bollam. For services to the communities in Upwey and Weymouth, Dorset.
- Philip Moore Bolton. Director of Music, Royal Belfast Academical Institution. For services to Music in Northern Ireland.
- James Bond. Foster Carer, Essex County Council and lately Chair, the Fostering Network. For services to Children and Young People.
- Mrs Susan Pippa Bonner. For voluntary service to the North Wales Wildlife Trust.
- Michael Leslie Bonsier. Chairman of the Board of Governors, Coulsdon Sixth Form College. For services to Education.
- John Bonthron. Foster Carer. For services to Children in Caerphilly, South Wales.
- Mrs Patricia Bonthron. Foster Carer. For services to Children in Caerphilly, South Wales.
- Kenneth Bowden. For services to the community in Camborne-Redruth and Cornwall.
- The Venerable Dale Arthur Bowers. Archdeacon of St Helena. For services to the community in St Helena.
- Mrs Sue Brace. President, Care of Police Survivors. For services to the Police.
- Charles Edward Bracken. Chairman, SANE. For voluntary service to Mental Healthcare.
- Mrs Melanie Ruth Bradley. Chief Executive, Afghan Appeal Fund. For services to charity in Afghanistan.
- Mrs Cherry Buchanan Briggs. College Manager, Reid Kerr College, Paisley. For services to Scottish Further Education and Young People in Renfrewshire.
- Mrs Helen Anne Brown. Lately Board Member, Scottish Commission for the Regulation of Care. For services to Vulnerable People.
- Keith Brown. Shift Supervisor, FB Heliservices Ltd. For services to the Defence Industry.
- Laurence Brown. Police Constable, Ministry of Defence.
- Ms Lorna Frances Brown. For services to the Arts.
- Alex Brychta. Illustrator. For services to Children's Literature.
- Ms Catherine Mary Elizabeth Burke. Project Manager, Cabrini Children's Society. For services to Children and Families.
- Alan Eugene Burland. Engineer. For services to the community in Bermuda.
- Mrs Beverley Eleanor Ann Burns. Staff Officer, Consumer Affairs, Trading Standards Service, Department of Enterprise, Trade and Investment, Northern Ireland Civil Service.
- Philip Burns. Engineering Manager, BAE Systems Submarine Solutions. For services to the Defence Industry.
- Dr Samuel John Burnside. For services to the Arts in Northern Ireland.
- Philip Frederick Jocelyn Burton. For services to the community in Leigh, Dorset.
- Miss Mary Irene Butler. For services to the community in Launceston, Cornwall.
- Thomas Barbour Butterfield. Founder and Director, Masterworks Museum. For services to the community in Bermuda.
- Ms Hilary Cadman. Lately Chief Executive, Ipswich Women's Aid. For services to Victims of Domestic Abuse.
- Brian Cameron. Senior Technical Officer. For services to Science Engagement in Scotland.
- Timothy Campbell. Founder and Chief Executive Officer, Bright Ideas Trust. For services to Enterprise Culture.
- Kevin Derek Capon. Grade C2, Ministry of Defence.
- Mrs Joan Amelia Capp. For charitable services through the Bootle Refugee Aid UK and to the community in Bootle, Cumbria.
- Mrs Edna Carleton. For services to the communities in Lutton and Cornwood, Devon.
- Mrs Audrey Clare Carmichael. Volunteer, Thaxted Centre for the Disabled, Essex. For services to People with Disabilities and their Families.
- Peter Carpenter. Honorary Executive Secretary, University of Cambridge Kurt Hahn Trust. For services to Anglo-German relations and to Higher Education.
- Roger George Castle. For services to Gymnastics.
- Ms Lynette Catchpole. Lately Executive Officer, Case Resolution Directorate, UK Border Agency, Home Office.
- Dr Linda Margaret Caughley. Consultant Histopathologist. For voluntary service to the Northern Ireland Cancer Registry.
- Garry Chambers. Head of Business Management, Commercial Directorate, Department for Work and Pensions.
- Philip Chappell. Incidents and Emergencies Planning Manager, Environment Agency. For charitable services.
- Mrs Jacqueline Cheetham. For voluntary service to the Women's Institute in Lincolnshire.
- Paul Anthony Chick. Chairman, Carers' and Parents' Support Group and Dorset Police Carers' Support Group. For services to the community in Dorset.
- Wing Commander David John Chivers. For voluntary service to the Air Training Corps and the community in Devon and Somerset.
- Mrs Sayeeda Chowdhury. Outreach Worker, Longsight Sure Start Children's Centre, Manchester. For services to Children and Families.
- Mrs Janet Clayton. Trainer Manager, Compliance Trainer Unit, Reading, HM Revenue and Customs.
- Mrs Phyllis Close. Executive Officer, Department for Work and Pensions.
- John Coatman. Leader, Urban Saints Youth Group, Croydon. For services to Young People.
- Malcolm Ralph Cochrane. For services to the community in Shipton-under-Wychwood, Oxfordshire.
- Len Cockcroft. Chair of Governors, Cockermouth School, Cumbria. For services to Education.
- Mrs Jane Codona. For services to the Gypsy and Traveller community.
- David Collington. Lately General Dental Practitioner, North Road Dental Practice, Glasgow. For services to Dentistry.
- Brian Patrick Collins. Higher Officer, Risk and Intelligence Services, Hull, HM Revenue and Customs.
- Derek George Charles Connelly. Chair of Governors at Baildon C of E Primary School.
- Anthony Clive Conniford. Lately Assistant Director, UK Football Policing Unit, Home Office.
- Mrs Barbara Cooper. For services to the community in Mobberley, Cheshire.
- Rodney Hunter Gordon Corner. For services to the Coroners' System.
- Sister Catherine Brigid Corrigan. For services to International Health.
- John Peter Coulson. Prison Officer, HM Young Offenders' Institution Wetherby, Ministry of Justice.
- Mrs June Coulson. Departmental Secretary, Department of Psychology, Lancaster University. For services to Higher Education.
- Trevor Alan Cowlett. For services to Music in Oxford.
- Ian Crampton. For services to national and local charities.
- Lee Craven. For services to the community in Salford, Greater Manchester.
- William Edward Crispin. Volunteer, West Alvington Primary School, Kingsbridge, Devon, and School Crossing Patrol Officer. For services to Education.
- Andrew Raymond Crook. Senior Anatomy Technician, Royal Veterinary College. For services to Veterinary Science.
- Mrs Julia Crookall. Volunteer, Samaritans, Crewe. For voluntary service to Mental Healthcare in Cheshire.
- Clive Cumming. Foster Carer. For services to Children and Families.
- Mrs Sharon Mary Cumming. Foster Carer. For services to Children and Families.
- Garry Stephen Cunningham. Grade C2, Ministry of Defence.
- Dr William Francis Cunningham. General Practitioner, Corbridge Health Centre, Northumberland. For services to Primary Care.
- Ms Ann Cuthbert. Lately Personal Assistant, Health and Social Care Directorate, Scottish Executive.
- Roger James Dainty. Chief Technician, Biochemistry Department, University of Nottingham. For services to Scientific Research and Training.
- Mrs Hilary Dandy. For services to Cumbria Constabulary.
- Dr Glenis Carole Basiro Davey. The Open University, Science Faculty and Health Education and Training Programme, Africa. For services to Higher and Health Education.
- George Davies. Chair of Governors, Egglescliffe School, Cleveland. For services to Education.
- John Geraint Parcell Davies, JP. For services to the community in Swansea.
- James Davis. Good Childhood Adviser, The Children's Society. For services to Children and Young People.
- John Davis. Volunteer and campaigner for diabetic pump use, Hampshire. For services to people with diabetes.
- Trevor Diesch. Lately Policy Adviser, Department for Communities and Local Government.
- Councillor Pamela Anne Dixon. For services to the community in Altrincham, Greater Manchester.
- Mrs Colleen Doherty. Higher Officer, Small and Medium Enterprises Team, London, HM Revenue and Customs.
- Mrs Carol Anne Donnelly. Guided Tour Operator. For services to the Tourist Industry in Carlisle and the Borders.
- Professor Grace Dorey. Physiotherapist. For services to Healthcare.
- Brian Dorman. For voluntary service to Children Overseas.
- Miss Mary Doyle. Foster Carer and Adoptive Parent, Isle of Wight. For services to Children and Families.
- Jeffrey Edward Anthony Dudgeon. For services to the Lesbian, Gay, Bisexual and Transgender community in Northern Ireland.
- Ms Sarah Dummer-Wade. Founder and Chief Executive, Rerun, Dorset Runaways Service. For services to Young People.
- Michael John Dyer. For services to Young People in Essex.
- Dr Patricia Ann Ealey. For services to The Holly Lodge Centre and to People with Special Needs in Richmond and Ealing, London.
- Mrs Elizabeth Edmunds. Immigration Officer, Gatwick Airport, UK Border Agency, Home Office.
- Daren Morgan Edwards. Clinical Nurse Specialist in Plastic Surgery, Barts and the London NHS Trust. For services to Nursing.
- Miss Jennifer Anne Edwards. For services to people with disabilities in Surrey.
- Stephen Edwards. Prison Officer, HM Prison Stafford, Ministry of Justice.
- Frank Messiah Ellis (Fred). For services to the community in the London Borough of Haringey.
- David George Emery. For voluntary service to the Royal Naval Association in Uttoxeter.
- Paul Eskriett. Lately Principal Security and Contingency Planning Adviser, City of London Corporation. For services to Local Government.
- Miss Alison Evans. For services to Visually Impaired Young People in Sussex.
- Ms Ruth Elizabeth Evans. Chief Executive, Brewing, Food and Beverage Industry Suppliers Association. For services to Exports.
- Trevor George Evans. For services to Conservation and to Wildlife in Monmouthshire.
- Mrs Vivienne Evans. For services to the community in Dunstable, Bedfordshire.
- Major Martin James Everett, TD. For services to The Royal Welsh Regimental Museum.
- Christopher Farnaby. Head of Operations, CAA. For services to Aviation Safety.
- Ms Jean Fawcett. Director, Academic Development and Review, London Metropolitan University. For services to Higher and Further Education.
- Ms Marika Fawcett. Executive Officer, Private Office, Department for Work and Pensions.
- Mrs Magdalen Margaret Christian Fergusson. Secretary of the Royal Society of Literature. For services to Literature.
- Michael Andrew Fieldhouse. For services to the community in Grange-Over-Sands, Cumbria.
- Mrs Janet Finch. Lately Foster Carer, Coventry, West Midlands. For services to Children and Families.
- Mrs Jeannette Fish. Founder, Doncaster Cancer Detection Trust and St John's Hospice, Doncaster. For services to terminally ill patients.
- Alfred Robin Fisher. Past Master, Worshipful Company of Glaziers and Painters of Glass. For services to Architectural Stained Glass.
- Mrs Denise Fitzpatrick. For services to Disabled Children in Plymouth.
- David John Fletcher. Tank Warfare Historian. For services to Military Heritage.
- Donald Fletcher. For services to the voluntary sector in Lancashire.
- Mrs Janet Margaret Flint. For services to the community in Appleton Roebuck.
- Ms Pam Flora. Grade E1, Ministry of Defence.
- Terrance Michael Flynn. For services to the Community in Cardiff and Crime Prevention in Wales.
- Mrs Brenda Mary Forty. For services to Elderly People in Chesham, Buckinghamshire.
- Mrs Betty Clara Jessie Foxwell. Founder Member, Dulwich Kidney Patients' Association. For services to People with Kidney Disease.
- Ms Vanessa Frake. Head of Security and Operations, HM Prison Wormwood Scrubs, Ministry of Justice.
- David George Brian Francis. For services to disabled people in Wakefield, West Yorkshire.
- Mrs Margaret Anne Fraser. For political service.
- Ms Karen Gallagher. Artistic Director, Merseyside Dance Initiative. For services to Dance.
- Mrs Jacqueline Ann Gant. For services to the community in Bishop Thornton and Warsill, North Yorkshire.
- Miss Christine Ann Gaskell. Chair, North West Apprenticeship Ambassadors Network. For services to Training and Apprenticeships.
- Robert Hughes Gaskin. For services to the voluntary sector in Cornwall.
- Surjit Singh Ghuman. Founder of Panjab Radio. For services to Broadcasting.
- Hubert George Gibbs. Volunteer, Sussex Police. For services to the Police and the community.
- Cyril Gittins. Estate Yard Foreman to the National Trust at Attingham Park, Shropshire. For services to Heritage.
- Mrs Margaret Goodacre. For services to Caring for Elderly People in Malvern, Worcestershire.
- Dr Peter John Gordon. Lately General Practitioner and Police Medical Adviser, Northamptonshire. For services to Emergency Care.
- Mrs Marilyn Gordon-Jones. Chair, Sutton Old People's Welfare Committee, London. For voluntary service to Older People.
- Dr Andy Gotts. Photographer. For services to Photography and Charity.
- Dr Charles Herbert Gerard Gould. Chairman, Board of Governors, Carrickfergus Grammar School. For services to Education in Northern Ireland.
- Alan Goulding. Chair of Governors, St Francis Special School, Lincoln. For services to Education.
- Brian Grant. Base Manager, Babcock Marine. For services to the Defence Industry.
- Anthony John Gray. For services to the voluntary sector in Northumberland.
- Mrs Mary Elizabeth Gray. Lately Director, Kerith Counselling Service Ltd. For services to Counselling in the West of Scotland.
- David Robert Green. For charitable services, particularly to Boxing in Cambridgeshire.
- Mrs Diana Green. Environment Adviser, Sustainability and Diversity, London, HM Revenue and Customs.
- George Malcolm Green. For services to the community in Haverfordwest, Pembrokeshire.
- Mrs Carol Greenstock (Mrs Carol Watts). For services to Economic Development in Wales.
- Mrs Coral Marianne Greenwood. Lately Duke of Edinburgh Award Leader and Drama Teacher, Birkenhead High School Academy, Prenton, Merseyside. For services to Education.
- Miss Pam Griffin (Mrs Pamela Margaret Warry). Lately Higher Executive Officer, Inland Waterways Team, Department for Environment, Food and Rural Affairs.
- Mrs Elizabeth Griffiths. Volunteer, St Mary's Opportunity Group for Children with Special Needs. For services to Education.
- Peter Benjamin Griffiths. For services to Heritage.
- Mrs Sheila Gurnett. GirlGuide Leader and Community Worker, Buckinghamshire. For services to Children and Young People.
- Mrs Margaret Hackney (Maggie). For services to Healthcare and Families in Hertfordshire.
- Dr Avice Margaret Hall. Principal Lecturer, University of Hertfordshire. For services to Higher Education and to the community in St Albans.
- Mrs Jacqueline Hall. For services to the community in Merseyside.
- Ms Wendy Hall. For services to the voluntary sector in Wiltshire.
- Mrs Daphne Vernede Hamblin. For services to Children with Disabilities through the Wormwood Scrubs Pony Centre, West London.
- Ms Sally Hancox. For services to Reducing Carbon Emissions and Fuel Poverty in Social Housing.
- Ms Anna Lise Hansen. Chef/Proprietor, The Modern Pantry. For services to the Restaurant Industry.
- Mrs Dorothy Hardy. National Park Voluntary Ranger. For services to Conservation.
- David Harewood. Actor. For services to Drama.
- David John Harris. Divisional Managing Director, Cowlin Construction. For services to Education and Training in the Construction Industry.
- Michael Leonard Arthur Harrison. Lately Chief Superintendent, Staffordshire Police. For services to the Police.
- James Harvey. For public service.
- Tom Harvey. Chief Executive of Northern Film and Media. For services to the Creative Industries.
- Stephen Peter Hatcher. Deputy Head, St Aidan's C of E High School, Harrogate, Yorkshire. For services to Education.
- Robert James Haughey. For services to the Fishing Industry in Northern Ireland.
- Ms Andrea Haynes. Executive Officer, Jobcentre Plus, Department for Work and Pensions.
- David Lambon Heard. For services to the community in Birmingham.
- Christopher Michael Heaton. Head of Policy, Planning and Culture, Libraries Learning and Culture, Cambridgeshire County Council. For services to Libraries.
- Mrs Moira Laird Mctaggart Heeps. For services to the community in Brightons, Stirlingshire.
- Mrs Marion Olwin Hemmerdinger. Co-ordinator, Burton MIND. For voluntary service to Mental Healthcare in Staffordshire.
- Mrs Irene Henderson. Grade 3 Casework Specialist, Human Resources, Scottish Parliament.
- Colin Henry. Chair of Governors, Christ's College, Guildford, Surrey. For services to Education.
- Mrs Debbie Hepplewhite. Independent Phonics Consultant. For services to Education.
- Dr Caroline Mary Heaven Herbert. Chief Executive of Red Balloon Learner Centre Group. For services to Education.
- James Hewitt. For services to Financial Inclusion in Oxfordshire and to the local community.
- John David Hibberd. Deputy Headteacher, Thomas Mills High School, Framlingham, Suffolk. For services to Education.
- Peter Hickson. Chairman, Petty Pool Trust, Cheshire. For services to Young People.
- George William Higgs. Chair, Scottish Borders Equality Forum. For services to Community Relations.
- Professor Leonard Wareing Hill. For services to Fencing.
- Mrs Lynne Hill. For services to Independent Monitoring Board, HM Prison and Young Offenders Institution Doncaster.
- Nicholas John Hillsdon. State Registered Prosthetist, Queen Mary's Hospital, Roehampton. For services to Prosthetics and the community.
- Mrs Sheila Hinds. Lately Executive Officer, Pension, Disability And Carers Service, Department for Work and Pensions.
- Trevor Joseph Hing. For services to the community in Fairford, Gloucestershire.
- Vidar Paul Hjardeng. For services to Visually Impaired People and to Broadcasting.
- Mrs Doreen Mary Hobbs. For services to the community in Watlington, Oxfordshire.
- Mrs Beryl Lynn Hodgson. Chief Officer, Special Constabulary, Hampshire Constabulary. For services to the Police and the community.
- Dr Kathleen Rose Hodgson. Director of Learning and Teaching Support, University of Leeds. For services to Higher Education.
- Mrs Bernadette Holgate. Higher Executive Officer, Debt Management, Department for Work and Pensions.
- Mrs Diana Holl-Allen. Vice-chairman, Association of Police Authorities and Chair, West Midlands Police Authority. For services to the Police.
- Peter Hollins. For voluntary service to the Royal Naval Museum.
- Ms Patricia Holmes. Police Community Support Officer, Metropolitan Police Service. For services to community policing.
- Phillip Harry Holmes, JP. For services to the community in the West Midlands.
- Simon David Henry Holt. Chairman, South Wales Breast Cancer Network. For services to Healthcare in Carmarthenshire and South West Wales.
- Derek Holvey. Conductor, Four Counties Youth Orchestra. For services to Music in South East Wales.
- David Richard Honeywill. For services to the Fire and Rescue Service and the local community.
- Wing Commander Martin Richard Hooker. Grade C2, Ministry of Defence.
- Miss Emma Mary Constance Hope. Shoe Designer. For services to the Fashion Industry.
- Ms Jane Hopkins. Founder, MumsClub Official website. For services to Entrepreneurship.
- Alan Peter Horsfield. Stone Mason. For services to St Paul's Cathedral in London.
- Lawrence Houghton. Senior Officer, Compliance and Technical Liaison, Bootle, HM Revenue and Customs.
- Richard Howe. Lately Executive Director, Estates and Facilities, Cambridge University Hospitals NHS Foundation Trust. For services to the NHS.
- Mrs Jacqueline Howell. Executive Officer, Jobcentre Plus, Department for Work and Pensions.
- John Huddleston. Lately Knowledge Leader and Project Director, AEA Technology. For services to the Environment.
- Mrs Lynne Hughes. For services to the community in North Wales.
- Rodney Hughes. Businessman. For services to Business in Newark, Nottinghamshire.
- Mrs Hilary Humphreys. For services to Education and Sport in North Wales.
- Colin Hunt. Activity Mentor, Wirral Positive Futures. For services to Vulnerable Young People and the local community.
- Mrs Jennifer Lesley Hursell. For services to the community in Southwold, Suffolk.
- Walford John Hutchings. Musical Director, Pontnewydd Male Voice Choir. For services to Music and to the Community in Torfaen.
- Mrs Hifsa Haroon Iqbal, DL. For services to Community Cohesion in Staffordshire.
- Anthony Hyman Isaacs. Past President, Solicitors' Disciplinary Tribunal. For services to the Legal Profession.
- Dr Gabriel Obukohwo Ivbijaro. General Practitioner and Clinical Director, Walthamstow, London. For services to the NHS.
- Mrs Denise Jackson. For services to Scottish Gymnastics.
- Christian Jacobs. Senior Mechanic, Antarctic Logistics and Expeditions. For services to Scientific Research in the Antarctic.
- Meredydd Davies James. Lately Headteacher, Rhymney Comprehensive School, Caerphilly. For services to Education.
- Norman Jarvis, JP. For services to Road Safety.
- Mrs Eileen Jayne-Wood. Fundraiser, The Rowans Hospice and Founder and Group Travel Organiser, Portsdown Travel, Portsmouth. For charitable services.
- Miss Helen Jenny. For services to Dartmoor National Park and to Young People in Devon and Cornwall.
- Ian David Johns. Coxswain, Newhaven Lifeboat, Royal National Lifeboat Institution. For services to Maritime Safety.
- Mrs Joanne Elizabeth Johnson. Bereavement Counsellor. For services to Bereavement Counselling and Training in Lancashire.
- Professor Rhona Susan Johnston. Professor of Psychology. For services to Education.
- John Jones. Master Framer. For services to the Arts.
- Miss Norma Jones. Higher Executive Officer, School Standards Group, Department for Education.
- Roy Lindsey Jones. Community Liaison Manager, Scottish Power. For services to Young People in Wales.
- Mrs Cecilia Mary Jordan. Volunteer, Special Olympics. For services to Disability Sport.
- Dr Hasmukh Joshi. Lately General Practitioner. For services to Medical Education and to the Royal College of General Practitioners.
- Mrs Mini Joti. Health Visitor, Bridgeton Health Centre. For services to the NHS and the community in the East End of Glasgow.
- Dr Raman Kapur. Chief Executive, Threshold. For services to People with Mental Illness in Northern Ireland.
- Mrs Morella Kayman. Vice-President, Alzheimer's Society. For services to Healthcare.
- Professor James Keaton. For services to Heritage in the North West.
- Ms Robyn Keeble. For services to Community Activism and Youth Empowerment.
- Peter William Kellett. Special Inspector, Lancashire Constabulary. For services to the Police.
- Paul Kelly. Volunteer Coastguard Rescue Officer. For services to Maritime Safety.
- Mrs Tricia Kemp. For voluntary service to Children with Hearing Disabilities.
- Mrs Mary Kendall. For services to the community in Ingleton, Lancashire.
- Mrs Helen Marion Kennedy. Chair, Rocktalk. For services to Blind and Visually Impaired People in Stirling.
- Ms Lulu Kennedy. Founder, Fashion East. For services to the Fashion Industry.
- Mrs Eileen May Kenny. Head of Quality, South West College. For services to Further Education in Northern Ireland.
- Mrs Lily Kerr. Head of Bargaining and Representation for UNISON. For services to Industrial Relations in Northern Ireland.
- Councillor Jeremy Alan Kite. Councillor. For services to Local Government in Dartford.
- George Gordon Archibald Knowles. Welfare Officer, Disabled Police Officers' Association. For services to the community in Northern Ireland.
- Mrs Margaret Laidlaw. For voluntary service to UNICEF.
- John Lambert. For services to People with Disabilities in Weymouth and Portland, Dorset.
- Professor Stephen Lambert-Humble. Head of Dentistry, University of Kent, South East. For services to Dental Care and Education.
- Keith Clarke Lambourne. Director of Export, ACO Group. For services to Construction Exports.
- Mrs Geraldine Susan Lane. Author, Parent's Guide to Plymouth. For services to Families.
- Miss Hilary Frances Jane Lane. Lately Cultural Strategy Manager, East Sussex County Council. For services to the Arts in East Sussex.
- Miss Irene Grace Langton (Dolly Langton). For voluntary service to Animal Welfare and to the local community.
- Brian Stewart Larkman. Adviser, Debt Management Office. For services to the Financial Services Industry and the Debt Management Office.
- Mrs Jayne Law. UK and Ireland Sales Manager, DOW Building Solutions. For services to the Insulation Industry.
- Mrs Barbara Lawrence. For voluntary service to the community in Rhayader.
- Maurice Victor Laws. Catering Consultant. For services to the UK Hospitality Sector.
- Mrs Helen Theresa Ledger. Administrative Officer, Personal Tax- Operations, Manchester, HM Revenue and Customs.
- Ping Nam Lee (Peter). For services to the Chinese Community in Cambridge.
- Mrs Elizabeth Anne Leigh. For services to the British Red Cross and to the community in Newbury, Berkshire.
- Miss Anne Leonard. For services to Unemployed Young People through Operation New World.
- Jeffrey Norman Levick. For services to Disability Cricket in Hampshire.
- Mrs Alison Lewis. Grade C2, Ministry of Defence.
- David Lewis, JP For services to the community in South East London.
- Mrs Margaret Elizabeth Lewis, BEM. For services to the community in St Albans, Hertfordshire.
- Ms Ursula Frances Rosamond Lidbetter, DL. Chief Executive, Lincolnshire Co-operative Limited. For services to Business in Lincolnshire.
- Ms Julie Lightfoot. managing director, Solar Solve Marine. For services to International Trade.
- Mrs Rosanna Lightfoot. For services to the community in Glenridding and Patterdale, Cumbria.
- Mrs Joan Little. Executive Officer, Complaints and Appeals Directorate, Child Maintenance and Enforcement Commission, Department for Work and Pensions.
- Mrs Renée Alice Logan. Volunteer, North West Ulster Group, Institute of Advanced Motorists. For services to Road Safety in Northern Ireland.
- John Rae Lonsdale. For voluntary service in North Yorkshire.
- Mrs Joanne Lonsdale-Frith. Partnership Manager for Tesco. For services to Disadvantaged People in Greater Manchester.
- Thomas Lord. Third Secretary, Foreign and Commonwealth Office.
- Mrs Alison Lowe. Senior Officer, Customer Operations, Manchester, HM Revenue and Customs.
- Mrs Prudence Jennifer Lundie. Welfare Officer. For services to the British community in Cyprus.
- Mrs Pamela Elizabeth Lycett. For services to Hockey in Staffordshire.
- James Edward Lyons. Helicopter Safety Expert. For services to Aviation Safety.
- Mrs Edith Joan Christabel Macauley, JP. For services to the community in the London Borough of Merton.
- Donald John Mackay. For services to the Harris Tweed Industry.
- Gustav Macleod. Chair of Governors, Thomas Bewick Special School, Newcastle upon Tyne. For services to Education.
- Graham Livingstone Macqueen. For charitable services in Oban and Lorn, Argyll.
- Mrs Flora Magee. For services to the community in Northern Ireland.
- Mrs Ann Maggs. For services to the community in Grimsby and Cleethorpes, North East Lincolnshire.
- Mrs Rosemary Magill. For services to Women's Aid Antrim, Ballymena, Carrickfergus, Larne and Newtownabbey in Northern Ireland.
- Al'adin Maherali. For services to the Voluntary Sector and to Business.
- Mrs Therese Mahindrakar, JP. For services to the community in Bolton, Greater Manchester.
- Mrs Anne Marie Marley. Respiratory Nurse Consultant, Belfast Health and Social Care Trust. For services to Healthcare in Northern Ireland.
- Mrs Yvonne Marr. For voluntary service to the Royal British Legion Scotland.
- Andrew Martin. Lately Superintendent, Bedfordshire Police. For services to the Police.
- Councillor Peter James Martin, DL. Leader, Essex County Council. For services to Local Government.
- Ms Stephanie Martin. Lately Family Court Adviser, Cafcass Leeds and Foster Carer. For services to Children and Families.
- Mrs Dorothy Martland. Founder of Diversity in Barrier-Breaking Communications. For services to Young People.
- Mrs Mary Maunder. Coach, St Joseph's Swimming Club. For voluntary service to the community in Cardiff.
- John Francis May. For services to the community in Lichfield, Staffordshire.
- Harold James Mayes. Deputy Principal, Northern Ireland Prison Service, Northern Ireland Executive.
- Henry Irwin Mayne. Social Worker, Belfast Health and Social Care Trust. For services to Visually Impaired People in Northern Ireland.
- Ms Angela McBain. Past President, British Association of Dental Nurses. For services to Dental Nursing.
- William McCallum. For services to Sport in Argyll and Bute.
- Mrs Ann McCrea. Breastfeeding Co-ordinator. For services to Healthcare in Northern Ireland.
- Mrs Patricia McDermott. For services to People with Disabilities in Northern Ireland.
- Mrs Glenys McDonald. Senior Judges' Clerks' Manager, Royal Courts of Justice, Ministry of Justice.
- Mrs Sally-Rose Alice McFerran. For services to SSAFA Forces Help.
- Duncan McGarry. National Family Liaison Adviser, National Policing Improvement Agency. For services to the Police.
- Mrs Winifred McGeorge. For services to Social Housing in Burnley, Lancashire.
- Ian McGibbon. Lately Serious Youth Violence Adviser, Home Office. For services to Tackling Gang-Related Violence.
- Patrick McGonagle. Managing Director of Pakflatt Ltd. For services to Economic Development in Northern Ireland.
- Rory McIlroy. Golfer. For services to Sport.
- Ms Avril McIntyre. Chief Executive Officer, Lifeline Community Projects. For services to the community in Barking and Dagenham.
- Mrs Sarah McKiernan. Finance Director's Office Manager, Jobcentre Plus, Department for Work and Pensions.
- William James McKittrick. For services to the community in Craigavon, Northern Ireland.
- Mrs Susan McTaggart. Policy and Reform Manager, Police Staff, Merseyside Police. For services to the Police.
- Dudley Sharratt Mead. For services to Civic Society in Croydon.
- Mrs Valerie Mellor. For services to swimming in the North West.
- John Metcalf. Composer. For services to Music.
- Mrs Barbara Micklethwaite. For services to the community in Oldham, Greater Manchester.
- Anthony Miller. Director, Whitechapel Mission. For services to Homeless People.
- Ian Eric Miller. For services to Ultralow Temperature Physics at Lancaster University.
- Mrs Christine Angela Mills. Founder, Hope for Tomorrow Charity. For charitable services to Healthcare in Gloucestershire.
- Ms Margaret Mills. Project Worker, Children 1st. For services to Children and Young People in Scotland.
- Peter Alastair Mills. For services to the Conservation of Ecclesiastical Buildings and to the community in Dorking, Surrey.
- Mrs Frieda Patricia Minns. For services to the community in Sutton Bridge, Lincolnshire.
- Mrs Olive Muriel Anderson Minors. For services to the community in Chester.
- Brian Mister. Lately Trustee, Essex Coalition of Disabled People. For voluntary service to People with Disabilities.
- Mrs Maria Christina Miyazaki. Vice-Consul, Tokyo, Japan.
- Terence Monaghan. For services to the community in Stock, Essex.
- Mrs Jean Margaret Moore. For services to the voluntary sector in Cheshire.
- Jason Moore-Read. Business Manager, Border Force Central Region, Home Office.
- Mrs Monica Anne Moreton. For services to Adults with Learning Difficulties through the Oaks Tree Farm Rural Project in Staffordshire.
- Mrs Alice Ellen Morgan. For services to the Girl Guides in Pembrokeshire.
- Mrs Rosemary Ann Somers Morrison. For services to Disabled Sailing.
- Leslie Mosley. For services to disabled people in Birmingham.
- Mrs Lesley Moss. HR Services Manager for Salford Royal NHS Foundation Trust. For services to the community in Salford.
- Leslie Norman Moss. Fundraiser, Cancer Research UK. For charitable services.
- Squadron Leader Herbert Nevil Mottershead, DFC. For voluntary service to the 158 Squadron Association.
- Mohammed Saeed Moughal. For services to the community in Birmingham.
- Mrs Valerie Moyes. Teacher, St Ambrose High School, North Lanarkshire. For services to Education and Music.
- Ms Maura Muldoon. For public service.
- Mrs Jane Findlay Murray. For services to Tayside Fire and Rescue and Local Government in Scotland.
- John Black Murray. For services to Arts and Culture and to the community in Dumfriesshire.
- Michael James Muskett. For services to Social Enterprise Aid and to the community in Norfolk.
- Peter Rice Muxworthy. For services to the community in Swansea.
- Alexander Nairn. Executive Officer, Pension, Disability and Carers Service, Department for Work and Pensions.
- Miss Pauline Nandoo. Co-ordinator, Southwark Day Centre for Asylum Seekers.
- Dr Adam Naylor. DL Lately Chair, Lakeland Arts Trust. For services to the Arts in Cumbria.
- Mrs Hilary Needham. Founder and Manager, Special Needs and Parents charity. For services to children and young people with disabilities and their families.
- Ms Anesta Eileen Newson. For services to Adults with Intellectual Disabilities in Sudbury, Suffolk.
- Dr Lui Nam Ng (Stephen). For services to the Chinese Community in London.
- William Eric Nicholls. For voluntary service to the Sainsbury's Veterans' Association.
- Derek Edward Thomas Nicholson. Lately Chair of Governors, Cramlington Learning Village; Governor, The King's School, Tynemouth and Registrar Emeritus, Newcastle University. For services to Education.
- Stephen John Nicholson. For services to St John Ambulance in Bedfordshire.
- Mrs Valerie Nixon. For services to the Royal National Lifeboat Institution.
- Geoffrey Michael Norris. For voluntary service to the Royal National Lifeboat Institution in Arran, North Ayrshire.
- Winston Stephen Nurse. For services to the community in Leicester.
- Geoffrey Malcolm Oakes. Lately Clerk to the Board of Governors, Reaseheath College. For services to Further Education.
- Mrs Eilish O'Doherty Manager, Age Concern Derry. For services to Older People in Northern Ireland.
- Sean Francis O'Donovan Lately Assistant Head Teacher, Cardinal Wiseman Catholic School, Coventry. For services to Education.
- Michael James O'Reilly. Foster Carer, Staffordshire. For services to Children and Families.
- Mrs Phyllis O'Reilly. Foster Carer, Staffordshire. For services to Children and Families.
- David Orrell. Senior Executive Officer, Pension, Disability and Carers Service, Department for Work and Pensions.
- Mrs Jeannette Orrey. School Meals Policy Adviser, Food For Life Partnership. For services to Food in Schools.
- Eric Llewellyn Osmond. For services to the community in Wareham.
- Frank O'Sullivan Founder and Coach, Birmingham City Amateur Boxing Club. For services to Amateur Boxing.
- Mrs Barbara Joyce Owen. Chair, The Three Rivers Museum of Local History. For services to the Heritage of Rickmansworth and the Three Rivers District.
- Dr Richard Nicholas York Owen. Director, Aspire Trust Ltd. For services to Arts Based Business.
- Robert James Owen. Caretaker, Llanfawr Primary School. For services to the community in Holyhead, Anglesey.
- Malcolm John Ozin. For services to the Jewish Community in London.
- Stephen James Palmer. Second Secretary, Foreign and Commonwealth Office.
- Mrs Susan Diane Pamphlett. Inward Visits Manager, Overseas Office, Department of Chamber and Committee Services, House of Commons.
- Mrs Robina Parkes. For services to the community in Northern Ireland.
- Rudolph Parkes. For services to National and International Fundraising and Voluntary work.
- Major Sylvia Ann Parkin, TD DL Regional Campaign Director, SaBRE, Ministry of Defence.
- Malcolm Ross Parkinson. Chair, Capel Manor College, Enfield, Middlesex. For services to Further Education.
- Alexander Glynn Francis Parry. Community Liaison Officer, Serious Organised Crime Agency. For services to Law Enforcement.
- Christopher John Parry. Grade C2, Ministry of Defence.
- Mrs Doreen Cynthia Parsonage. For services to the community in Wormley, Hertfordshire.
- Anwer Ibrahim Issa Ismail Patel. Managing Director, Cohens Chemist Group. For services to community pharmacy.
- Mrs Madhurika Patel. For services to the Indian community in Greater Manchester.
- Christopher Douglas Paterson. For services to Scottish Rugby.
- Ms Rowena Dorothy Patrick. For voluntary service to the Burma Star Association.
- James Darryl Peacock. England Rugby League Captain and Leeds Rhinos Prop Forward. For services to Rugby League.
- Mrs Patricia Laura Peake. Founder, Healing Hearts Bereavement Group. For charitable services.
- Miss Ingrid Pears. Founder, Ingrid Pears – hot glass. For services to the Export Business.
- Mrs Doris May Peat. Mid-Day Assistant, Coopers' Company and Coborn School, London Borough of Havering. For services to Education.
- James Peel, JP. Lately Assistant Senior Education Officer, South Eastern Education and Library Board. For services to Young People in Northern Ireland.
- Roger Frederick Penfold. For services to the Amateur Swimming Association South East Region and to Local Government in Berkshire.
- Mrs Rosemary Pennington. For services to the community in Cambridge.
- Ms Corinna Penrose. Lately Commissioner, Mental Welfare Commission. For services to Mental Health in Scotland.
- Vernon Courtney Petherick. Chair of Governors, Crookhorn Technology College, Waterlooville, Hampshire. For services to Education.
- Dr Margaret Joy Philippou. For voluntary service to Young People.
- Ms Caroline Phillips. Head of Corporate Services, Uganda, Department for International Development.
- Ms Linda May Phillips. Founder and Director, Roots & Shoots Charity, Lambeth, London. For services to Young People.
- The Reverend Prebendary Sam Philpott. For services to the community in Plymouth, Devon.
- David Pickering. For services to Cleveland Constabulary.
- Mrs Ann Picton. Lately Headteacher, Clytha Primary School, Newport. For services to Education.
- Michael Alan Pigott. Technical and Development Manager – Ballistic Protection, Ministry of Defence.
- Mrs Jane Elizabeth Plumb. Chief Executive, Group B Strep Support. For services to Child Healthcare.
- Miss Karen Pollock. Chief Executive, Holocaust Educational Trust. For services to Education.
- Mrs Denise Poore. Leader, Marsh Farm Sure Start Children's Centre, Luton, Bedfordshire. For services to Children and Families.
- Roger John Pope. Lately Head of Student Services, Trinity Laban Conservatoire of Music and Dance and Music Examiner, Trinity College London. For services to Higher Education.
- Mrs Marion Price. For voluntary service to Surrey Learning Disability Partnership Board.
- Mrs Dorothy Pritchard. For services to People with Intellectual Disabilities in Warrington, Cheshire.
- John Railton. For services to Music.
- Professor Derek Jeffrey Raine. Director, Physics Innovations Centre for Excellence in Teaching, University of Leicester. For services to Science Education.
- Hanif Mohammad Raja. For services to Inter-Faith Relations in Scotland.
- Bajloor Rashid. Restaurateur and President, Bangladesh Caterers Association. For services to Bangladeshi Catering.
- Charles Frederick Melville Rawlinson. For charitable services to Young People and to Music.
- Alderman John Mervyn Rea. Alderman, Antrim Borough Council. For services to Local Government and the community.
- Mrs Anne Read. For services to Heritage in North Yorkshire.
- Michael Peter Read. President, Channel Swimming Association. For services to Swimming.
- Christopher John Reed. For services to the Scouts and to the community in Llanelli, Carmarthenshire.
- Mrs Beatrice June Rees. For charitable services in Pembrokeshire.
- Martin Lewis Rees. Lately Higher Officer, Customer Operations, Cardiff, HM Revenue and Customs.
- Mrs Irene Grace Reid. School Crossing Patrol Officer, Longridge Primary School. For services to Road Safety.
- Mrs Agnes Mary Reilly. Chairman, Belfast Titanic Society. For services to Maritime and Industrial Heritage in Northern Ireland.
- John Howard Rigby. Sergeant, Lancashire Constabulary. For services to the Police.
- Miss Deborah Laraine Roberts. Leader, 8th Llandudno Rangers. For services to Young People in Conwy, North Wales.
- Mrs Eirwen Griffiths Roberts. For services to the community in Ynysddu, Newport.
- Professor Richard Roberts, SME. Market Analysis Director, Barclays Business. For services to UK Small and Medium-Sized Businesses.
- Ian Robertson. Lately Chief Executive, National Council for Graduate Entrepreneurship. For services to Enterprise.
- Mrs Antonina Robinson. Executive Officer, Jobcentre Plus, Department for Work and Pensions.
- David Robinson. Founder, Northern Ireland Transplant Association. For services to Healthcare in Northern Ireland.
- Mrs Mary Robinson. For voluntary service to the British Red Cross Society in Hexham, Northumberland.
- Neil Robinson. National Coach, Paralympics GB Table Tennis Team. For services to Disabled Sport.
- Robert Moore Robinson. Principal, Rainey Endowed School, Magherafelt. For services to Education in Northern Ireland.
- Mrs Karen Mary Robson. Executive Officer, Jobcentre Plus, Department for Work and Pensions.
- Frank Rochford. Counsellor, Cruse Bereavement Care Scotland. For voluntary service to Vulnerable People.
- David Michael Rodigan. Radio Presenter. For services to Broadcasting.
- Mrs Josephine Mary Rogers. For services to the community in Macclesfield, Cheshire.
- Richard Nicholas Anthony Rose. Second Secretary, Foreign and Commonwealth Office.
- Frazer Stuart Ross. Second Secretary, Foreign and Commonwealth Office.
- Mrs Patricia Ann Ross. For services to Carers through Crossroads Care in Harrogate, Craven and York, North Yorkshire.
- Mrs Susan Ross. Grade C1, Ministry of Defence.
- Philip James Rowe. For voluntary service to the British Red Cross Society in Somerset.
- Mrs Denise Rowland. Lately Head, School of Early Years Health and Social Care, New College Durham. For services to Further Education.
- Mrs Rhona Roy. For services to Capability Scotland.
- Mrs Ann Salih. For services to the community in Norton-le-Moors, Staffordshire.
- Mrs Michelle Salter. For voluntary service to the SSAFA. Forces Help in Norfolk.
- Clarence Sarkodee-Adoo. For services to Music.
- Mrs Eva Minni Schloss. For services to Education through the Anne Frank Trust.
- Mrs Elizabeth Ann Schofield. For services to the community in Langham, Essex.
- Graham Schuhmacher. Head of Development Services, Rolls-Royce plc. For services to Apprenticeships and Skills Training.
- Mrs Rosemary Jane Buchan Segrove. Founder and Chair, Beaconsfield Talking Newspaper, Buckinghamshire. For services to People with Visual Impairment.
- Mrs Hazel Norah Margaret Sewell. Counsellor, Cedar House, Lancashire. For voluntary service to Mental Healthcare.
- Mrs Janette Sharples. Higher Officer, Charities, Assets and Residence International, Manchester, HM Revenue and Customs.
- The Reverend Andrew James Shaw. For services to the community in Fleetwood.
- Mrs Constance Gwendoline Shepherd. For services to the community in Thurcroft, South Yorkshire.
- Mrs Maureen Helen Milne Shepherd. Lately Chair, Board of Management, Inverness College, University of the Highlands and Islands. For services to Education.
- Richard Michael Sherry. For services to the Publishing Industry and to the community in Northern Ireland.
- Mrs Susan Ann Sheward. Founder and Chair, Orangutan Appeal UK. For services to the Endangered Primates of Asia.
- Alexander David Richard Simpson. For services to the community in Polmont, Stirlingshire.
- Ms Joanne Simpson. Head, Humanitarian Team, Pakistan, Department for International Development.
- Ms Debora Singer. Policy and Research Manager, Asylum Aid. For services to Women.
- Ms Harbans Kaur Singh. For services to the community in Hounslow.
- Dennis Slaughter. For services to Motocross.
- David Smith. Director, Customer Support, South Eastern Regional College. For services to Further Education in Northern Ireland.
- Douglas Smith. Advance Skills Teacher, Swanshurst School, Billesley, Birmingham. For services to Education.
- Mrs Gillian Smith. For voluntary service to Oxfam.
- Dr Ian Geoffrey Smith. Founder and Global Medical Director, Synexus, Lancashire. For services to Health Research.
- John Smith. Manager, Seven Day Centre. For services to Vulnerable Children and Young People in Lanarkshire.
- Mrs Marilyn Joy Smith. Conductor and Musical Director, Glasgow Phoenix Choir. For services to Music.
- Councillor Marion Smith. Councillor, North Down Council. For services to Local Government in Northern Ireland.
- Michael Smith, JP For services to the community in Netherfield, Nottingham.
- Ms Sarah Jayne Smithurst. Police Officer, Nottinghamshire Police. Forservices to the Police, Crimestoppers and the British High Commission in Ghana.
- Bakhshish Singh Sodhi. For services to Race Relations in Gravesend.
- Leo Solomon. For services to Music in Grimsby.
- Sister Helen Mary Spragg. For services to International Health.
- Ms Madeleine Starr. Head of Innovation, Carers UK. For services to Employment.
- Geoffrey Eric Michael Stevens. For services to the community in Matlock, Derbyshire.
- Ms Sarah Diana Stevenson. Taekwondo World Champion. For services to Martial Arts.
- Timothy Philip Stimpson. Facilities Manager. For services to Oxfordshire County Council.
- Mrs Dawn Stoddard. Learndirect Outstanding Learner of the Year 2010. For services to Further Education.
- Mrs Carol Stone. Personal Assistant, Metropolitan Police Service. For services to the Police.
- Royston Kenneth Stone. For services to the community in Kingswood, Gloucestershire.
- Anne, Lady Stoneham of Droxford. Trustee of UK Youth and Member of the Avon Tyrrell Trust. For services to Young People.
- Ms Carole Mary Stott. Chair of Governors, City Literary Institute. For services to Adult Education.
- Mrs Margaret Straughan. Lately Genetics Team Member, Department of Health.
- Mrs Anne Stuart. Chair, Cassiltoun Housing Association. For services to Housing and Regeneration in Castlemilk, Glasgow.
- Inderpal-Singh Sumal. For public service.
- Mrs Ethel Swann. Co-founder, Play in Schools, Nottingham. For services to Children and Families.
- Mrs Pamela Swanwick. Positive Play Consultant, Derbyshire County Council. For services to Education.
- Peter Alfred Sweet. For services to the community in Shrewton, Wiltshire.
- Paul Taylor. Front Line Service Manager, Corporate IT, Department for Work and Pensions.
- Stewart Taylor. For services to Nature Conservation in the North of Scotland.
- Mrs Lila Thakerar. Pharmacist. For services to the community in the London Borough of Harrow.
- Philip John Thickett. Lately Area Operations Manager East, Northern Rail. For Services to the Rail Industry.
- Dr Timothy James Thirst. For services to the Stalham Brass Band, youth music and to the community in Stalham, Norfolk.
- John Malcolm Thomas. Lately Director, National Farmers' Union Cymru. For services to Agriculture in Wales.
- Julian John Wilding Thomas. Lately National Library of Wales Conservation Treatment Unit Manager. For services to Conservation Science and Bookbinding.
- Mrs Margaret Thomas. For charitable services in Holyhead, North Wales.
- Mrs Rowena Thomas-Breese. For services to Disabled Swimming and Charitable Fundraising.
- Ernest Victor Thompson. For services to Literature and to the community in Cornwall.
- Mrs Helen Thomson. For services to the Brownies in Scotland.
- Mrs Hilary Thomson. For voluntary service to Fairtrade.
- Peter Thorp. For services to the Fire and Rescue Service and the community.
- Councillor Robert Tidy. Farmer. For services to Local Government and the community.
- Mrs Margaret Proudfoot Timpson. For services to Older People in Knutsford, Cheshire.
- Trevor Tindle. For services to the community in Great Houghton, South Yorkshire.
- Mrs Susan Marian Tither. Constable, Metropolitan Police Service. For services to the Police.
- Brian Leslie Toney. For services to the community in Gweek and Culdrose, Cornwall.
- Nigel Patrick Truscott. For voluntary service to St John Ambulance in Jersey.
- Mrs Heather Christine Turner. For political and voluntary service.
- Mrs Kathleen Mary Tyson, BEM. Guide Leader, 36th Nottingham Guide Group. For services to Young People.
- Mohammed Foiz Uddin. For services to Community Cohesion.
- Ezekiel Ukairo. For services to promoting Racial Harmony and Integration in Longsight, Greater Manchester.
- Graham Douglas Underdown. Charity Fundraiser. For services to Charitable Fundraising.
- Christopher Bernard Upham, BEM. Volunteer, National Association of Retired Police Officers, Cheshire Constabulary. For services to the Police.
- Allen Robert Urch. For services to swimming in Nottinghamshire.
- Ms Sue Urwin. Probation Officer, Hertfordshire Probation Trust. For services to Offenders in Hertfordshire.
- Umesh Valjee. Cricketer. For services to Deaf Cricket.
- Dr Pieter Thomas Van Der Merwe. General Editor, National Maritime Museum. For services to Heritage and the local community of Greenwich.
- Miss Keti Vatcha. Administrative Assistant, Distribution Team, Benefits and Credits, Preston, HM Revenue and Customs.
- Geoffrey Arthur Vernon. For services to Market Drayton Festival Centre, Shropshire.
- Miss Margaret Rose Vinten. For voluntary service to Derian House, Chorley, Lancashire.
- Ms Eileen Mary Viviani. Grade C1, Ministry of Defence.
- Ms Faith Wainwright (Mrs Faith Glynn). Director, Arup. For services to the Built Environment and Engineering Professions.
- Dr Brian Walker. Lately Director, University of Winchester Centre of Religions for Reconciliation and Peace. For services to Higher Education.
- Professor Marion Fraser Walker. Professor of Stroke Rehabilitation, University of Nottingham. For services to Stroke Rehabilitation and Stroke Survivors.
- Mrs Morcea Antoinette Walker. For services to the community in Northamptonshire.
- Professor Robert Lloyd Walker. Member, Social Security Advisory Committee. For services to Social Policy Research.
- Mrs Barbara Walton. For services to the community in Greater Manchester.
- Peter Tyndall Walwyn. For services to Horseracing.
- Clive Warcup. For services to the Road Haulage Industry and Charitable Work.
- Mrs Glynis Elizabeth Ward. For voluntary service to the community in Cannock Chase.
- Robert Ward. Volunteer Driver, North West Ambulance Service. For services to the community in Merseyside and Cheshire.
- Mrs Sandra Irene Warzynska. For services to Business and to the community in the East Midlands.
- Mrs Gillian Moyra Waters. Lately Organiser, Edith Cavell Day Centre, Norfolk. For services to Older People.
- Mrs Maureen Watkin. For voluntary service to St John Ambulance in the West Midlands.
- David Anthony Watson. Founder, Heart Research UK. For services to Research and Cardiothoracic Surgery.
- Mrs Eileen Watson. Lately Teacher, Ashfield Girls High School, Belfast. For services to Education in Northern Ireland.
- Mrs Mary Rose Watt. For services to Highland Dance Teaching in Rossshire.
- John Damian Waugh. Chair of Governors, Our Lady Queen of Peace School, Tyne and Wear. For services to Education.
- Malcolm John Webb. For services to the community in Brewood, Staffordshire.
- Mrs Marion Aileen Webb. For services to the community in Dorset.
- William Edward Webber. For voluntary service to the Royal British Legion in South Molton.
- Mrs Mary Webster. For services to Music and Education in Kirkby Overblow and Harrogate, North Yorkshire.
- Vincent Wedlock-Ward. Projects Officer, Southern Housing Group. For services to Disadvantaged Households and the Environment.
- Mrs Josephine Ann Weir. Chair, Covent Garden Community Association. For services to the community in London.
- Jefferson Welsby. Physical Education Senior Officer, HM Prison Kennet, Ministry of Justice.
- Thomas Joseph Welsh. For services to the Sport of Athletics in Northern Ireland.
- Mrs Eileen Patricia Wheatley. Lately Senior Social Worker, Cambridgeshire County Council. For services to Children and Young People.
- Kevin James Whelan. Messenger, HM Treasury.
- Michael David Whine. For services to Community Cohesion.
- Mrs Edwina Mary White. For services to Counselling in South East Wales.
- Keith Anthony White. For services to Sport.
- Mrs Pamela Josephine Whitehead. For services to Avon and Somerset Constabulary.
- Alexander Whitfield. Counsellor, Third Sector Solutions. For services to Jobseekers in Bristol.
- Mrs Beti Williams. Lately Director, IT Wales, Swansea University. For services to Women in Science, Engineering and Technology.
- John Williams. For services to the community in Foulden, Berwickshire.
- Martyn Elwyn Williams. For services to Rugby.
- Richard Williams. managing director, Poldark Mine. For services to UK/Mexico relations.
- Thomas Michael Williams. Lately Chair Betsi Cadwaladr University Health Board. For services to Healthcare in Wales.
- Ms Yvette Williams. Equality and Diversity Policy Adviser, Crown Prosecution Service.
- John Victor Williamson. Owner, Valley Hotel Fivemiletown. For services to Tourism in Northern Ireland.
- John Russell Charles Wills. Assistant Director, MRC. National Institute for Medical Research. For services to Science.
- Alderman Kevin John Wilson. Member, Milton Keynes Council. For services to Local Government.
- Mrs Ellen Winser, DL. Chair of Board of Governors, Truro and Penwith College. For services to Further and Higher Education.
- Ms Jess Wood. For services to Lesbian, Gay, Bisexual and Transgender and Young People in Brighton and Hove.
- Mrs Wendy Rosalind Wood. Policy Lead, Coastguard Rescue Service Project, Department for Transport.
- Frederick Ralph Woodhams. Laboratory Technician, City of London School. For services to Young People.
- Mrs Katharine Woodhouse. For services to the community in Mortlake, London Borough of Richmond-upon-Thames.
- Frederick Edward Wooding. For services to Athletics in the East of England.
- Alan Woodiwiss. Founder, Sutton High Football Club. For services to Amateur Football.
- Mrs Shirley Woodman (Mrs A). For services to the community in Yorkshire.
- Mrs Lyndie Wright. Founder, Little Angel Theatre. For services to the Craft of Puppetry.
- Paul Gerard Peter Yates. Lately Examiner, Official Receiver, Insolvency Service Leeds, Department for Business, Innovation and Skills.
- Akram Zaman, JP. Chairman, Protocol. For services to the community in Northamptonshire.

=== Royal Red Cross ===
==== Royal Red Cross (Second Class) (ARRC) ====
- Major Helen Elizabeth PURVIS, Queen Alexandra's Royal Army Nursing Corps, Territorial Army

=== Queen's Police Medal (QPM) ===
- Wendy Benson, Chief Superintendent, Ministry of Defence
- Andrew Brennan, Detective Chief Superintendent, West Yorkshire Police
- Stephen Burns, Detective Chief Inspector, Metropolitan Police Service
- Jacqueline Cheer, Temporary Chief Constable, Cleveland Constabulary
- Hugh Duncan, Special Constable, Grampian Police
- Simon Chesterman, Assistant Chief Constable, West Mercia Police
- Richard Philip Dejordan Crompton, Chief Constable, Lincolnshire Police
- Nicholas Gargan, Chief Constable, National Policing Improvement Agency
- Caroline Goode, Detective Chief Inspector, Metropolitan Police Service
- Alan Goodwin, Deputy Chief Constable, Derbyshire Constabulary
- Francis Habgood, Deputy Chief Constable, Thames Valley Police
- Simon Hughes, Lately, Detective Inspector, Metropolitan Police Service
- Anthony Jones, Detective Constable, Greater Manchester Police
- Adrian Leppard, Commissioner, City of London Police
- Geeta Rani Lota, Police Constable, West Yorkshire Police
- Mark Mathias, Chief Superintendent, South Wales Police
- Ruaraidh Nicolson, Chief Superintendent, Strathclyde Police
- Deborah Jayne Platt, Detective Superintendent, Derbyshire Constabulary
- David Reynolds, Police Constable, Tayside Police
- Alexander Ross Robertson, Police Inspector, Chairman of British Transport Police Federation
- Mark Simmons, Deputy Assistant Commissioner, Metropolitan Police Service

=== Queen's Fire Service Medal (QFSM) ===
- Cameron Black, Temporary Group Commander, Strathclyde Fire and Rescue
- David Boyd, Watch Commander, Strathclyde Fire and Rescue
- Howard David Robinson, Coventry
- Christopher Gerrard Anderson, West Yorkshire
- Peter Alec Crook, Hampshire

=== The Queen's Volunteer Reserves Medal (QVRM) ===
- Captain David Paul BOLLAND, British Army, General List Territorial Army
- Warrant Officer Class 2 John Edward COLLINS, British Army, Royal Corps of Signals Territorial Army
- Flight Lieutenant Stephen John DUDDY Royal Auxiliary Air Force
- chief petty officer(New Entry Instructor) David Henry GIBSON, Royal Naval Reserve
- Brigadier Joseph Gerard d'INVERNO, TD, British Army, late The Royal Highland Fusiliers Territorial Army
- Warrant Officer Class 2 Richard John HOLDING, British Army, Adjutant General's Corps (Royal Military Police) Territorial Army
- Lieutenant Colonel Iain David LEVACK, TD, British Army, Royal Army Medical Corps, Territorial Army
- Sergeant Stephen STEWART Royal Auxiliary Air Force

=== Colonial Police Medal (CPM) ===
- Detective Inspector Adeniyi Collins OREMULE. Royal Cayman Islands Police Service

== Crown Dependencies ==
=== The Most Excellent Order of the British Empire ===
==== Commander of the Order of the British Empire (CBE) ====
Jersey

- Nigel Mansell, for services to children and young people

Isle of Man

- Edwin Davies, for charitable services

==== Officer of the Order of the British Empire (OBE) ====
Guernsey

- Kenneth Henry Tough, for services as Her Majesty's Greffier in Guernsey

Jersey

- Terry Le Sueur, for political service

==== Member of the Order of the British Empire (MBE) ====
Guernsey

- Alison Merrien, for services to the sport of Bowls

Jersey

- Annette Langley, for services to Family Nursing and Home Care, and to the Nursing Profession
- Nigel Truscott, for voluntary service to St. John Ambulance in Jersey

Isle of Man

- Catherine Christian, for services to youth in the Isle of Man
- Elaine Christian for services to the community in the field of Criminal Justice

=== Lieutenant of the Royal Victorian Order (LVO) ===
Jersey

- Lt Col Anthony John Charles Woodrow, OBE, MC, QGM. Chief of Staff and private secretary to the Lieutenant-Governor of Jersey

== Saint Vincent and the Grenadines ==
=== The Most Excellent Order of the British Empire ===
==== Officer of The Order of the British Empire (OBE) ====
- Morlene Eselin, Mrs. Whittaker. For Public Service.

==== Member of The Order of the British Empire (MBE) ====
- Henrietta Dorothea, Mrs. Hector. For Public Service.
- Theresa, Mrs. Richardson. For services to Education and Public Service.

== The Cook Islands ==
=== The Most Excellent Order of the British Empire ===
==== Dame Commander of The Order of the British Empire (DBE) ====
- Ms Pauline Margaret Rakera George Karika (Mrs. Ernest John Taripo), MBE For services to the public and to the community.

==== Officer of The Order of the British Empire (OBE) ====
- Tevai Vaka Matapo. For public service and services to the community.

==== British Empire Medal ====
- Josephine, Mrs. Lockington. For services to the public and to the community.

== Grenada ==
=== The Most Excellent Order of the British Empire ===
==== Officer of The Order of the British Empire (OBE) ====
- Raymond Noel. For public service.

==== Member of The Order of the British Empire (MBE) ====
- Lennon Mapson. For services to Agribusiness.
- Llewellyn George Smith. For services to broadcasting.

=== British Empire Medal ===
- Bertrand John. For services to Agriculture.

== Solomon Islands ==
=== The Most Excellent Order of the British Empire ===
==== Officer of the Order of the British Empire (OBE) ====
- Edith Mary, Mrs. Koete. For services to the Health Service, the Church and the community.
- Father Peter Noel Orudiana. For services to Education, Media, the Church and the community.

==== Member of the Order of the British Empire (MBE) ====
- Annie Marciala, Mrs. Saenemua. For public service, and services to the Church and the community.
- Edmund Sikua. For services to, and to the development of the Royal Solomon Islands Police.

==== British Empire Medal ====
- Nathaniel Mosese. For services to the Royal Solomon Islands Police.
- Ms Gwen Ratu. For services to the educational development of the Royal Solomon Islands Police.
- John Magu Rove. For services to the Royal Solomon Islands Police.
- John Walenenea. For services to the Royal Solomon Islands Police.

== Saint Vincent and the Grenadines ==
=== The Most Distinguished Order of Saint Michael and Saint George ===
==== Commander of the Order of Saint Michael and Saint George (CMG) ====
- The Honourable Judith Stephanie, Mrs. Jones-Morgan. For services to the administration of Justice and the development of Law.

=== The Most Excellent Order of the British Empire ===
==== Officer of the Order of the British Empire (OBE) ====
- Nicole Jacintha, Mrs. Bonadie-Baker. For services to education and the community.
- Godfred Timothy Pompey. For his contribution to National Security and Public Service.

==== Member of the Order of the British Empire (MBE) ====
- Herman Louis Belmar. For services to education and the environment.
- Murray Seyon Hadaway. For service to business and the community.
- Dwight Derrick Lewis. For services to the development of the Cadet Force and Disaster Preparedness.

== Antigua and Barbuda ==
=== The Order Most Distinguished Order of Saint Michael and Saint George ===
==== Companion of the Order of Saint Michael and Saint George (CMG) ====
- His Excellency Doctor Carl B.W. Roberts For public service.

=== The Most Excellent Order of the British Empire ===
==== Officer of the Order of the British Empire (OBE) ====
- Winston Anthony Bailey. For services to Music.

==== Member of the Order of the British Empire (MBE) ====
- Vaughan Walter. For services to Cultural Arts.

== Belize ==
=== The Most Excellent Order of the British Empire ===
==== Commander of the Order of the British Empire (CBE) ====
- The Honourable Bernard Quentin Augustus Pitts. For his contribution to the Law and Public Service.

==== Member of the Order of the British Empire (MBE) ====
- Ms Anne Rebecca Gillett-Elrington. For services to the Belizean Diaspora and Medicine.
- Louise Bridget, Mrs. Lewis. For services to Education and to Community Development.
- Ludwig Lightburn. For services to Sports and to the community.
- His Worship Simeon Lopez, JP. For his contribution to Education and Public Service.
- Enelda, Mrs. Rosado. For services to Education and to Community Development.
