= James Holloway =

James or Jim Holloway may refer to:

- James L. Holloway Jr. (1898–1984), U.S. Navy admiral, superintendent of the U.S. Naval Academy
- James L. Holloway III (1922–2019), U.S. Navy admiral, Chief of Naval Operations, 1974–1978
- Jim Holloway (climber) (born 1954), American boulderer
- Jim Holloway (artist) (?–2020), artist who worked for TSR in the 1980s
- James Holloway (conspirator) (died 1684), English merchant
- Jim Holloway (baseball) (1908–1997), Major League Baseball pitcher
- James Holloway (historian) (born 1948), British art historian
- Red Holloway (James Wesley Holloway, 1927–2012), American jazz saxophonist
