= Michael Thomas Jackson =

British plant scientist

Michael Thomas Jackson OBE. (born 1948). Plant taxonomist, appointed as an OBE in the New Year's Honours List (2012) for services to international food science.

Studied Environmental Botany and Geography at the University of Southampton (1970), at Birmingham University on the M.Sc. course in the 'Conservation and Utilization of Plant Genetic Resources' (1971) followed by a Ph.D. on researching the evolution of the potato, much of it based in Peru. Then at the International Potato Center (CIP), Lima, Peru, until 1981. He taught plant taxonomy and crop plant evolution at the University of Birmingham (1981 - 1991). Next he was at the International Rice Research Institute (IRRI) in the Philippines (1991 - 2010). He was Head of the Genetic Resources Center at IRRI (1991 - 2001), which included responsibility for managing the International Rice Genebank Collection (IRGC), and from 2001 until he retired in 2010 he was IRRI's Director for Program Planning and Communications. He has published over 100 articles.

Elected a Fellow of the Linnean Society of London in 1972.
