= James Holloway (historian) =

British art historian (born 1948)

James Holloway CBE
- Born: James Essex Holloway; 1948 (age 77–78); Westminster, Greater London
- Education: Courtauld Institute of Art
- Occupations: Art historian and museum director

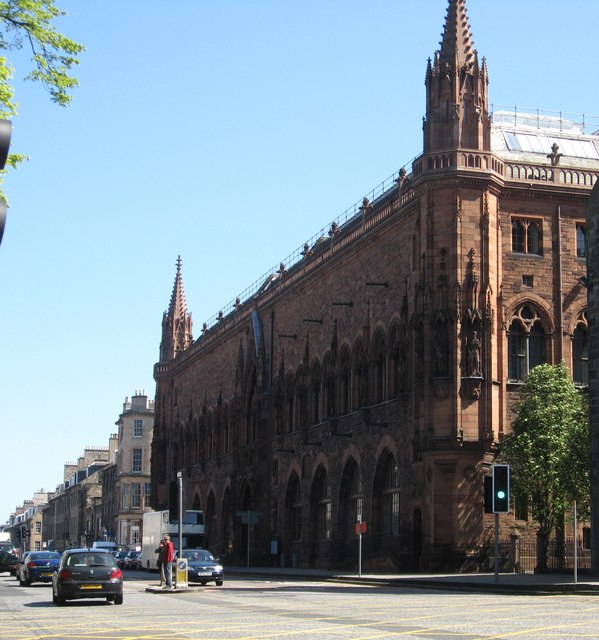
The Scottish National Portrait Gallery

James Essex Holloway CBE (born 1948) is a British art historian who was the director of the Scottish National Portrait Gallery from 1997 until 2012.

== Education and personal life ==
Holloway was born in Westminster in 1948 and educated at the Courtauld Institute (University of London).

Holloway enjoys motorcycles and plays the French horn.

== Career ==
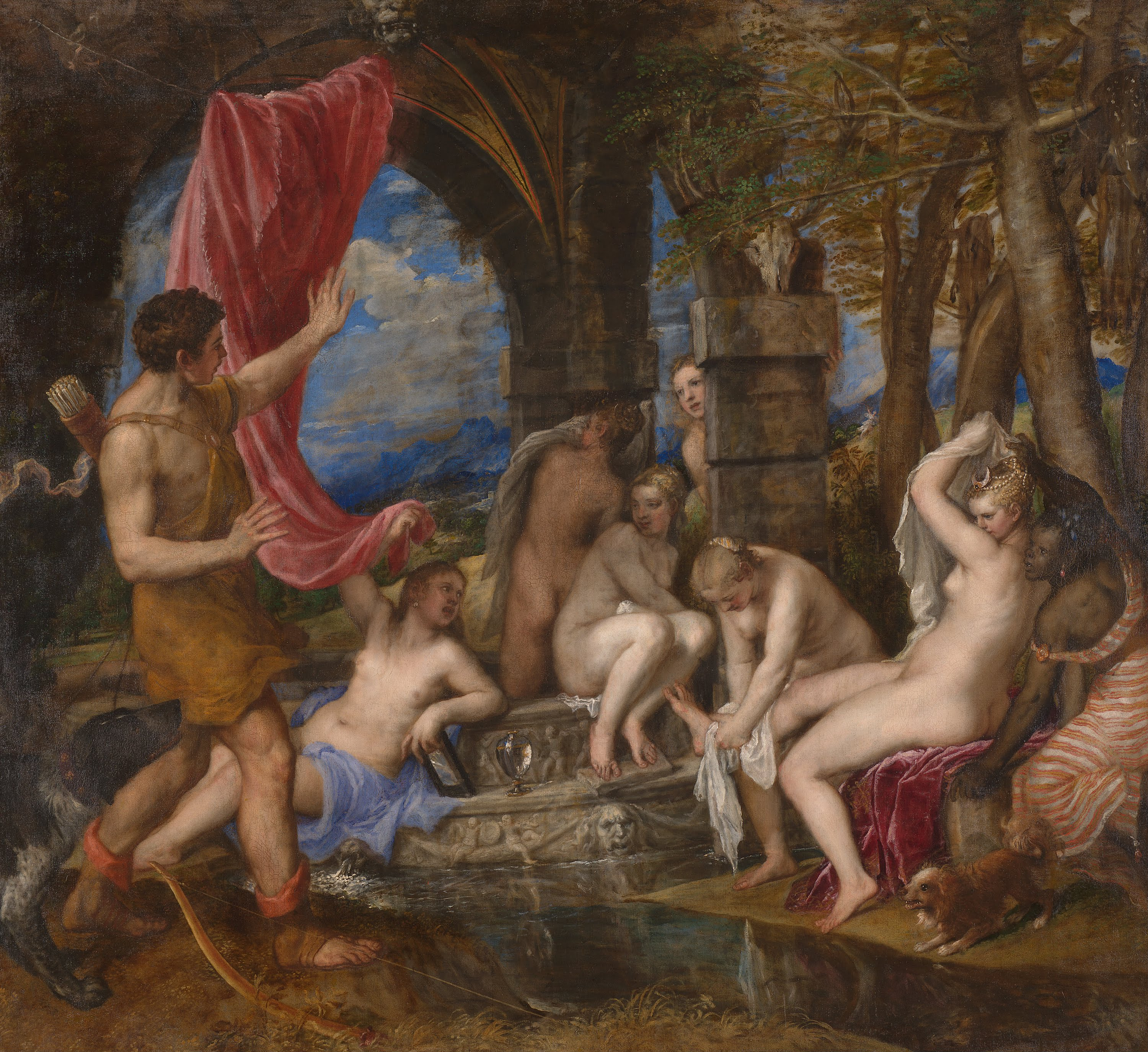
Diana and Actaeon, by Titian

=== Early career ===
In 1972, Holloway became a research assistant at the National Gallery of Scotland. Following this, Holloway became Assistant Keeper at the National Museum of Wales in 1980. Holloway then joined the Scottish National Portrait Gallery in 1983 as a Deputy Keeper.

=== Directorship of the Scottish National Portrait Gallery ===
In 1997, Holloway was appointed as Director of the Museum. While Holloway was director, a successful campaign to raise funds to secure the Diana and Actaeon painting for the nation was undertaken. In an article with the Scotsman at the time of his retirement, it was reported "the purchase of an Allan Ramsay portrait of philosopher David Hume is among his fondest memories".

A large refurbishment was also undertaken during his tenure. Formerly, the building was shared with the National Museum of Antiquities, now the Museum of Scotland, until they moved to a new building in 2009. Following this move, the refurbishment of the Portrait Gallery began with funding from the Scottish Government and the Heritage Lottery Fund, amongst others. The cost of the refurbishment was £17.6 million.

Holloway retired from the position of Director of the Scottish National Portrait Gallery in 2012.

=== Career since directorship of the Scottish National Portrait Gallery ===
Since retirement, Holloway has become the chairman of the Board of Trustees of the Abbotsford Trust responsible for Abbotsford House, the former home of Sir Walter Scott. Holloway is also a trustee of the Fleming Wyfold Foundation and of the Historic Scotland Foundation.

== Honours ==
Holloway was appointed a Commander of the Order of the British Empire (CBE) in the 2012 New Year Honours.

== Bibliography ==
=== Books ===
- The Face of Scotland: The Scottish National Portrait Gallery at Kirkcudbright. National Galleries of Scotland. 2008. ISBN 9781906270131.
