= International Resources for the Improvement of Sight =

International NGO that specialized in prevention of blindness

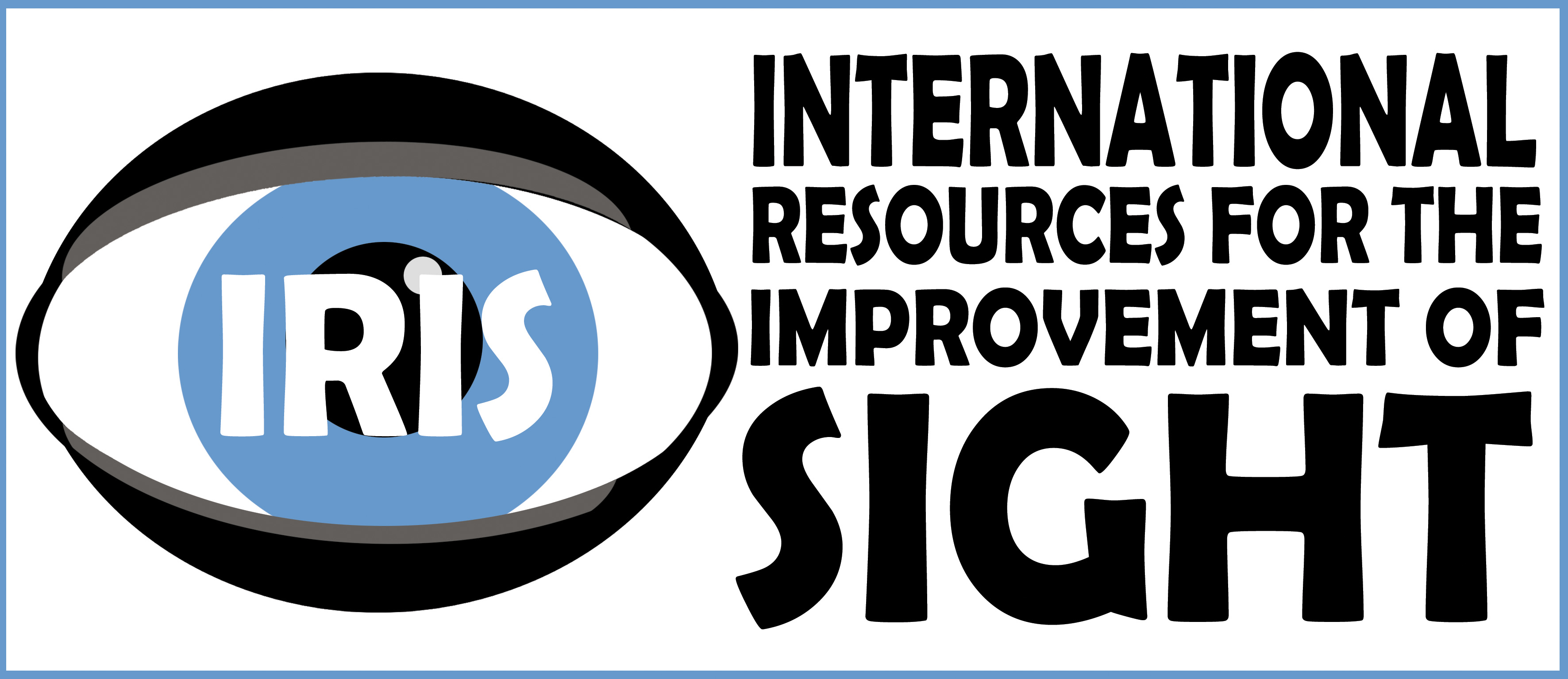
- Founded: 1996
- Founder: Michele Claudel, John Stewart
- Type: Charity
- Purpose: Prevention of blindness and restoration of sight
- Location: Switzerland
- Origins: France, US, UK
- Region served: 4 countries
- Key people: Roger Biggs (Chief Executive), John Sandford-Smith, Andy Richards (Trustees)
- Website: http://www.irisasia.org

International Resources for the Improvement of Sight (IRIS) is an International NGO that specializes in prevention of blindness and restoration of sight. It was founded in 1996 by Michele Claudel and John Stewart. It was initially founded to help people in Cambodia without access to eye care, it has since expanded to Nepal, Lao PDR and Sri Lanka. IRIS equips new eye clinics, strengthens existing ones, conducts eye screening, provides cataract surgery for poor people, primary eye care training for staff.

IRIS has partnered with other NGOs to provide funding for services, such as with The Vision Charity in Sri Lanka. IRIS has also partnered with the Cambodian government program National Program for Eye Health in establishing eye clinics. Another partner is the International Centre for Eyecare Education.

As of December 2008, the combined total of IRIS clinic and eye camp programs since its inception in Cambodia had resulted in 125,319 people receiving eye examinations and 23,485 surgeries being performed free of charge, 15,291 of which were to remove cataracts.

In 2011, Roger Freeland Biggs was the CEO of IRIS and he was awarded an OBE "for services to Health in Asia".

== See also ==
- International Council of Ophthalmology
