= Miranda Stevenson =

Scottish zoologist and conservationist

Miranda Stevenson OBE is a Scottish zoologist and conservationist.

She is an expert in the conservation of marmosets and tamarins, and serves on the European Association for Zoos and Aquaria (EAZA) Callitrichid Taxon Advisory Group.

In her career in zoo-based conservation, she was the Deputy Director of Edinburgh Zoo and Director of Marwell Zoo. From 2003 to 2013, she was Executive Director of the British and Irish Association of Zoos and Aquariums.

She is an associate of the Royal (Dick) School of Veterinary Studies at the University of Edinburgh and Chair of Trustees of Wildlife Vets International. She is a Trustee of the World Land Trust and Marwell Wildlife. In 2012, she was appointed an OBE for services to wildlife conservation. She is an honorary fellow of the Royal Zoological Society of Scotland.
