= David Reid (businessman) =

British businessman

Sir David Reid
- Born: David Edward Reid; 5 February 1947 (age 79); Scotland, United Kingdom
- Education: Fettes College
- Alma mater: Aberdeen University
- Occupation: Businessman
- Years active: 1970–present
- Title: Finance director of Tesco plc (1985–97); Deputy chairman of Tesco plc (1993–2004); Non-executive chairman of Tesco plc (2004–11); Chairman of Kwik-Fit (present)

Sir David Edward Reid (born 5 February 1947) is a British businessman and chartered accountant. He was until 2011 the chairman of Tesco, Britain's largest supermarket chain.

== Early life ==
Reid was educated at Fettes College.

== Career ==
Reid qualified as a chartered accountant with Peat Marwick Mitchell in 1970.

He was appointed chief accountant for Philips Video and then for International Stores before becoming finance director of Tesco in 1985. He became deputy chairman of Tesco in 1996 and chairman in 2004.

He is also a non-executive director of Reed Elsevier and chairman of Kwik-Fit. He was previously a non-executive director of Legal & General, Westbury and De Vere Group.

== Charitable work ==
He is a director of the Tesco Charity Trust which spends circa £5m per annum on good causes. He is a past chairman of Whizz-Kidz, a charity which seeks to help disabled children.

== Honours ==
Reid was knighted in the 2012 New Year Honours for services to business and charity.
