= Dianne Berry =

British psychologist and academic

Dianne Claire Berry, OBE, FAcSS (born 1955) is a British psychologist and academic. She is Professor of Psychology and Dean of Postgraduate Research Studies at the University of Reading, having previously served as Pro-Vice-Chancellor for Research (2003–2010) and Dean of Social Sciences. She joined the university in 1990 as a lecturer, receiving a chair in 1997.

She was awarded a first class degree in psychology at the University of Hertfordshire and a DPhil in Experimental Psychology at Oxford University, with the pioneering psychologist Donald Broadbent. Her primary research interests are in the area of risk communication, particularly in relation to health. She also has interests and expertise in human cognition, including memory, learning, attention and decision making. She has a large number of publications, including five books. Berry is an Academician of the Academy of Social Sciences and, in 2012, received an honorary fellowship of the British Psychological Society for an outstanding and sustained contribution to psychology.

Prior to her arrival at the University of Reading, she was a research fellow at the University of Oxford and Lecturer in Psychology at Balliol College, Oxford. She also qualified and worked as a journalist for several years before beginning her academic career.

Berry is Chair of Higher Education Funding Council for England (HEFCE)'s Research Excellence Framework 2021 Equality & Diversity Advisory Panel. In addition, she is Chair of Vitae's External Advisory Board.

Berry was appointed Officer of the Most Excellent Order of the British Empire (OBE) for services to scientific research in the 2012 New Year Honours list.
