= Heart Research UK =

UK charity organization

Heart Research UK is a national charity organisation in the United Kingdom. They fund medical research in to the prevention, treatment and cure of heart disease, as well as community projects aimed at improving the public's heart health. Since its foundation, Heart Research UK has funded over £25 million of research into heart disease and related conditions.

== Foundation and milestones ==
Heart Research UK was founded as the 'National Heart Research Fund' in Leeds in 1967 by eminent cardiovascular surgeon Mr David Watson, with the aim of making heart surgery safer. Following the death of a young patient after a long heart operation, Mr Watson launched an appeal with the Yorkshire Evening Post to raise funds to research ways to improve the safety of heart surgery.

Heart Research UK funded the first hospital-based cardiac research unit in the UK, at Killingbeck Hospital in Leeds. Whilst working here, Mr Watson developed a tissue valve in 1976 which became the prototype for many of the valves used in surgery today.

In 1979, Heart Research UK funded six of the first eight successful heart transplants in the UK, which were carried out by Sir Terence English at Papworth Hospital in Cambridgeshire.

In 2000, Heart Research UK funded the implantation of the world's first permanent artificial heart in to Peter Houghton, at the John Radcliffe Hospital, Oxford. Mr Houghton was fitted with a Jarvik 2000 pump, and is to this day a Guinness World Record holder for the 'Longest surviving artificial heart transplant patient.'

In 2005, The National Heart Research Fund changed its name to Heart Research UK and later opened up a regional office in Birmingham.

== Grants ==
Heart Research UK funds medical research through a programme of grants. Novel and Emerging Technologies (NET) Grants, of up to £250,000, are awarded to research projects which focus on the development of new technologies to diagnose, treat and prevent heart disease and related conditions and Translational Research Project (TRP) Grants, are awarded for projects that transfer breakthroughs into practical tools that can be used for patient care.

Heart Research UK also awards dedicated grants for Northern Ireland, aimed at encouraging applications and supporting research at hospitals and universities across the whole of the UK. In 2018, building on the success of the Northern Ireland Grants, Heart Research UK launched a similarly dedicated grant for Scotland.

== Research ==
Current medical research being funded by Heart Research UK includes a project with the University College London and Great Ormond Street Hospital to develop a much faster technique for imaging the hearts of babies born with congenital heart disease (CHD), a project at the University of Leicester using electrocardiograms (ECG's) to measure the risk of sudden cardiac death (SDC), and a project at the Bristol Heart Institute to repair the hearts of babies born with congenital heart disease (CHD) using stem cells from the umbilical cord.

== Masterclasses ==
Since 2012, Heart Research UK have funded 'Masterclasses', in which leading international and UK experts give surgeons, doctors, nurses, physiotherapists and other health professionals the opportunity to gain new skills and knowledge. By the end of 2018, 15 masterclasses will have taken place, covering topics such as heart transplantation, imaging, mitral valve surgery, aortic surgery and exercise prescription for congenital heart disease.

== Partnership with Subway ==
Since 2009, Heart Research UK has been partnered with Subway to support customers' choice for a low fat option. Together, they run the Heart Research UK and Subway Healthy Heart grant scheme, an initiative that funds community projects to promote heart health across the UK. These grants are funded by in-store collections and a programme of 5K runs across the UK.
