= Red Balloon Learner Centres =

Alternative school network in England

The Red Balloon Learner Centres

Location
- Various Locations, England

Information
- Established: 1996
- Founder: Carrie Herbert, MBE
- Website: www.redballoonlearner.org

Red Balloon Learner Centres provide education for children aged eleven to sixteen (eighteen at Red Balloon of the Air) who do not attend mainstream school due to bullying, trauma or mental health issues.

The first centre, in Cambridge, was set up in 1996 by founders Carrie Herbert and Ruth Loshak. There are now five physical centres: Cambridge, Norwich, North-West London, Reading and Worthing. There is also a blended online and face-to-face provision called Red Balloon of the Air whose aim is to provide an online recovery programme for children who cannot attend a physical centre. Each centre is a separate registered charity (apart from Worthing), as is Red Balloon Educational Trust, which provides centralised support for all centres.

== General information ==
The main aims of the Red Balloon are to:

- Provide alternative secondary education up to Key Stage 4 to children who have been severely bullied, suffered trauma and/or suffer from poor mental health that prevents them attending mainstream school
- Provide individual, full-time academic, pastoral and therapeutic programmes tailored to each student
- Provide a safe, supportive, and welcoming environment
- Encourage and model consideration and respect at all times
- Restore self-confidence
- Teach students how to respond to bullying
- Help students regain interest and engagement with their learning to reach their individual personal and educational goals.
- Help students return, as soon as possible, to mainstream education, progress to further education or find meaningful employment

The Centres provide a range of activities such as textiles, clay-work, painting, and African drumming, and the typical facilities include a science lab, a technology studio, a landscaped garden. There are only twenty students enrolled in a Centre at any given time, and most of the teaching is done on a one-to-one or small group basis.

== Locations ==
=== Red Balloon Cambridge ===
Red Balloon has operated in Cambridge for over twenty-five years, and is now made up of two smaller centres, which together have up to forty young people based in and around the Cambridgeshire area. They organise trips and visits throughout the year, ranging from short walks to local shops museums, to longer trips to London. Red Balloon Cambridge currently offers fourteen subjects.

=== Red Balloon Northwest London ===
Based in Harrow, Red Balloon Northwest London has up to twenty young people in the Northwest London area, and also has access to Harrow School’s sports facilities. It is assisted by Ben Bullen Adventures, so that the students can take part in the Duke of Edinburgh’s Award. Red Balloon Northwest London offers ten subjects but has the flexibility to cater to additional interests.

=== Red Balloon Norwich ===
Red Balloon Norwich is in the centre of town and has to up to forty students in the old Victorian property, as well as access to trained therapists. Red Balloon Norwich offers 22 subjects, and all kinds of qualifications including GCSEs, ASDANs, and technical awards.

=== Red Balloon Reading ===
Situated across from Reading College, Red Balloon Reading has up to 24 students. In addition to art and music therapies, students have access to equine therapy at the local equestrian centre. With seven subjects on offer students have the opportunity to gain a range of GCSE qualifications and awards. As part of the wellbeing and social re-engagement strands of Red Balloon, students participate in sporting activities such as boxing, kayaking, and fencing in town, and are encouraged to join trips to museums, zoos and cultural sites.

=== Red Balloon Worthing ===
Red Balloon’s fifth physical centre opened in 2022 in Worthing, and has up to twenty students.

=== Red Balloon of the Air ===
Inspired by the 1950s Australian radio education programme ‘School of the Air’, Red Balloon of the Air uses technology to bring education to students who cannot access one of the physical Centres. Like all Red Balloon students, they have access to BACP-registered therapists. Red Balloon of the Air is available across the southeast of England and is open to people aged 11–18. Red Balloon of the Air also has a post 16 provision called the Step4ward Programme which supports students aged 16–20 with an Education and Health Care Plan (EHCP) to retake GCSE exams, access therapy, participate in the social re-engagement activities and/or catch up on any additional education they need to reach their goals.

== Red Balloon Educational Trust ==
In 2021 Red Balloon Learner Centre Group changed their name to Red Balloon Educational Trust (RBET). After consolidation in 2021, Red Balloon Educational Trust includes the operations of Red Balloon of the Air, the new Red Balloon Worthing, as well as providing Central Services.
