= Howard Shiplee =

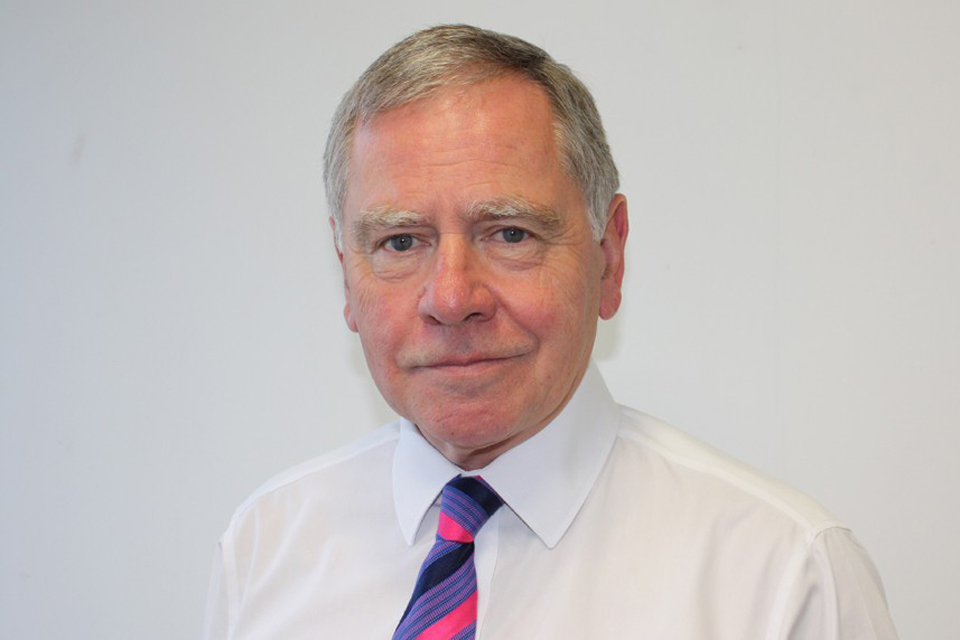
Government photograph

Howard John Shiplee CBE (born 1946/47) is a British manager of construction projects.

On 27 March 2013 the UK Department for Work and Pensions (DWP) announced that Shiplee was to be appointed to "lead the delivery of the Universal Credit project".

He was appointed in June 2006 as the construction director at the Olympic Delivery Authority for the 2012 Summer Olympics in London. He started work in September 2006. He developed, led and managed construction contracts, budgets and timelines for all permanent and temporary venues for the Olympics. He was also responsible for helping construction inspections, workmanship standards and best practice on site. As Director of Construction at the Olympic Delivery Authority he was paid £285,000 - £289,999 Per Annum.

Shiplee was appointed Commander of the Order of the British Empire (CBE) in the 2012 New Year Honours for services to construction.

Shiplee is a former director of specialist construction consultancy High Point Rendel. In 2006, he made sure that the new Ascot Racecourse was finished in time for that year's Royal Ascot.
