= Group B Strep Support =

- Abbreviation: GBSS
- Formation: 1996
- Legal status: Registered charity no. 1112065
- Purpose: To prevent life-threatening group B Strep infection in newborn babies
- Headquarters: Haywards Heath
- Region served: United Kingdom
- Website: http://www.gbss.org.uk

Group B Strep Support is a national charity based in the United Kingdom.

== History ==
Group B Strep Support was formed in 1996, after the founders' son had a group B Strep infection. Since then it has established a medical panel and set up a board of trustees. The charity has been heavily involved in public consultations on group B Strep prevention, and in 2012 commented on the National Screening Committee's review of GBS testing. In 2012, the chief executive Jane Plumb received an MBE for services for child health.

== Aims ==
GBSS states that it has three main aims:

- Offer information and support to families affected by group B Streptococcus
- Inform health professionals and individuals how most group B Strep infections in newborn babies can be prevented
- Generate continued support for research into preventing group B Strep infections in newborn babies

== Key achievements ==
- Worked with UK health professionals and professional medical bodies to raise the profile of group B Strep in the UK.
- Played a part in causing the 2003 RCOG risk-based guidelines on the prevention of early-onset group B Strep infection, and continues to campaign for improved guidelines and awareness in medical professionals.
- Raised significant public awareness of group B Strep and the impact a group B Strep infection can have on newborn babies if not prevented.

== Notable supporters ==
- Alasdair McDonnell
- David Cameron
- Hilary Jones (doctor)
- James Roby
- Jeffrey Donaldson
- Kate Garraway
- Nadine Dorries
- Nicholas Soames
- Philip Hollobone
- Theresa May

== Patron ==
- Chris Steele
- James Roby
- Nicholas Soames
