= Myfanwy Waring =

Welsh actress

Myfanwy Waring (born 1977) is a Welsh actress, best known for her role as PC Amber Johannsen in the ITV drama series The Bill. Her most recent on screen role was a minor role in BBC Birmingham's daytime soap opera Doctors playing Radio producer Cerys Williams.

== Biography ==
Waring was born in Dyfed in 1977. She studied acting at Rose Bruford College in London.

Waring made her screen debut as a credited extra in Club Le Monde (2002). She next appeared in 2003's The Modernista, a short film produced as part of the 48 Hour Film Project. Waring played "Woman" alongside Louis Waymouth as "Man".

Over the next few years, she appeared in small roles in dot the i, One Man and His Dog, Animal, and Ripper 2: Letter from Within, the sequel to 2001's Ripper.

Her first television role was that of PC Amber Johannsen in the ITV police procedural The Bill. She appeared on the show from December 2004 through December 2005.

Waring has also been featured in commercials for numerous companies and products:

- Fiat Punto
- Nicorette
- Confused.com
- Whiskas
- Ikea - Living Together TVC; 2013
- Go Compare 2014 (Llandofsavingmoney....gogocompare)

Waring appeared in a music video for the song Portent by the Southampton, England-based band The Psychics.

After leaving The Bill, Waring appeared in the films A Dogges Tale and Balkanski sindrom.

As of 2008, Waring is currently touring the United Kingdom performing Come On, Jeeves, a farcical P. G. Wodehouse comedy. She performs alongside Anita Harris, Victor Spinetti, and Derren Nesbitt. In June 2008, Waring co-starred in the web series Cell on Crackle.

In December 2004, Waring avoided serious injury when a Sri Lankan resort she was staying at was hit by a tsunami triggered by the 2004 Indian Ocean earthquake. Waring, who was swimming when the wave hit, was swept up by the wave, but was able to grab onto a tree and hold on until the waters receded.

== Filmography ==
- Club Le Monde (2002) as Extra
- The Modernista (2003) as Woman
- dot the i (2003) as Carmen's Friend
- Casualty (2004) as Lisa Clough
- One Man and His Dog (2004) as Tanya
- Ripper 2: Letter from Within (2004) as Sally Trigg
- The Bill (2004–2005) as PC Amber Johannsen
- Animal (2005) as Girlfriend Technician
- A Dogges Tale (2006) as Woman
- Balkanski sindrom (2007) as Jill
- Casualty (2007) as Tanya Stokes
- Portent (music video) (2007)
- Acts of Godfrey (2011) as Mary
