= 67 Blankets for Nelson Mandela Day =

South African blankets for charity

- Type: International non-profit organisation
- Founded: 27 January 2014
- Founder: Carolyn Steyn
- Website: https://67blankets.co.za/

67 Blankets for Nelson Mandela Day is an international non-profit organisation founded in South Africa to commemorate the first democratically elected President of South Africa, Nelson Mandela.

== History ==
The charity was started in December 2013 when Nelson Mandela's former assistant, Zelda la Grange, challenged Carolyn Steyn to knit 67 blankets to support the annual Mandela Day to be donated to those in need. Mandela Day was declared an annual international day by the United Nations in 2009, in honour of Nelson Mandela, celebrated each year on the 18th July, being Nelson Mandela's birthday.

In 2015, 67 Blankets for Nelson Mandela Day was introduced by the South African Department of Correctional Services as part of an offender rehabilitation programme in South African prisons.

== Guinness World Records ==
Since its establishment, 67 Blankets for Nelson Mandela Day has set three Guinness World Records, namely:

- the largest area covered by a crocheted blanket measuring 3,133 m² of handmade blankets knitted, crocheted or quilted displayed at the feet of the Nelson Mandela statue at the Union Buildings in Pretoria, on 21 April 2015;
- the largest crochet blanket measuring 17,188.57 m² (185,016 ft²), in collaboration with the South African Department of Correctional Services and the Nelson Mandela Foundation, displayed at the Drakenstein Correctional Centre in South Africa on 22 April 2016; and
- the longest crocheted scarf measuring 29.17 km (95,725 ft) displayed at the Mandela Capture Site in Howick, KwaZulu-Natal, South Africa on 29 July 2018.

== Other Notable Events ==
To commemorate 100 years since the birth of Nelson Mandela, 67 Blankets for Nelson Mandela Day partnered with the Zonderwater Maximum Correctional Centre in Cullinan, South Africa and the South African Department of Correctional Services to produce and display a portrait of Nelson Mandela made up of around 4,000 individual blankets.

In collaboration with the Johannesburg International Mozart Festival, 67 Blankets for Nelson Mandela Day attempted to break a Guinness World Record for the most people crocheting in one place simultaneously, in the Linder Auditorium in Johannesburg.

On 9 June 2021, 67 Blankets for Nelson Mandela Day unveiled its hand-crocheted and knitted Bokke Blanket in honour of the national rugby team, the Springboks, who won the 2019 Rugby World Cup in Japan.
