= Carolyn Steyn =

South African media personality (born 1960)

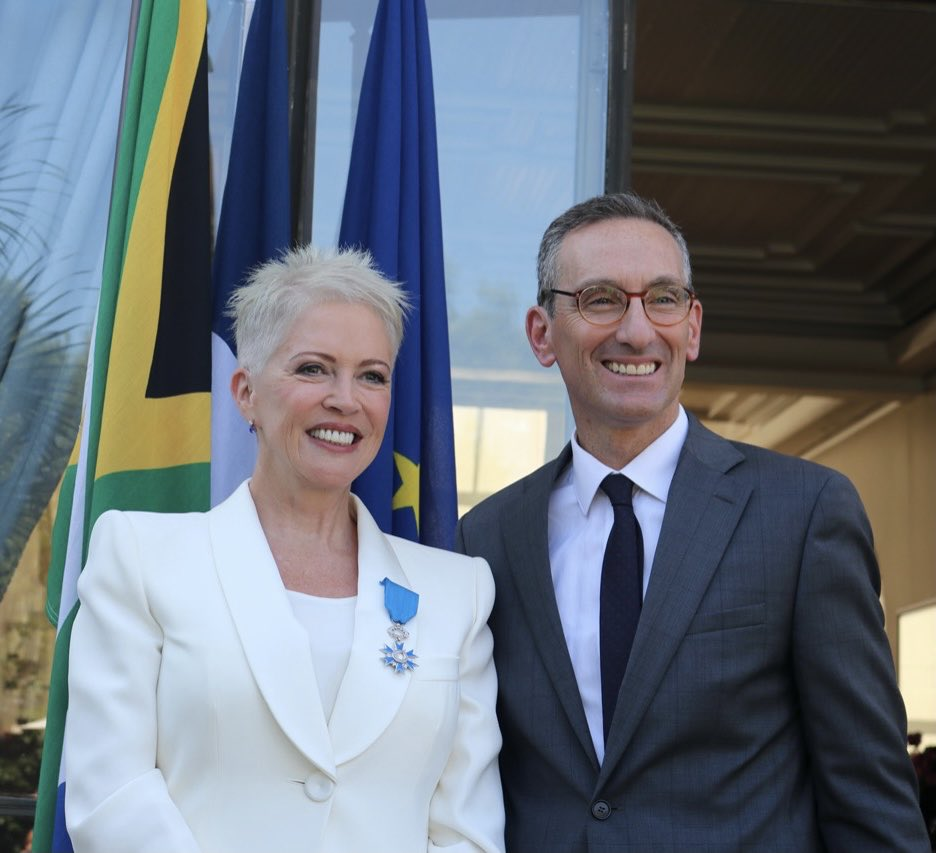
- Born: Carolyn Isabel Barkhuizen; 17 May 1960 (age 65); Johannesburg, Transvaal, Union of South Africa
- Education: Jeppe High School for Girls
- Alma mater: University of Witwatersrand; University of South Africa
- Occupation(s): Philanthropist, arts patron, media personality
- Years active: 1983 - present
- Organization: 67 Blankets for Nelson Mandela Day
- Spouse: Douw Steyn (married 2013 - died 2025)
- Parent: Johan Wilhelm Nicklaus Barkhuizen Yvonne Barkhuizen (née Mazotti)
- Website: 67blankets.co.za

Carolyn Steyn (née Barkhuizen; born 17 May 1960) is a South African media personality and founder of the non-profit organization, 67 Blankets for Nelson Mandela Day. In 2022, Carolyn Steyn received French Ordre national du Mérite.

== Early life ==
Steyn was born on 17 May 1960 in Johannesburg, South Africa. She attended Jeppe High School for Girls and matriculated in 1977. She received an honours degree in Speech and Drama from the University of Witwatersrand in 1981 and qualification in Teacher's Licentiate in Speech and Drama from the University of South Africa in 1980.

== Personal life ==
Steyn met South African billionaire businessman, Douw Steyn in 1999. In 2003, the pair married but divorced six months later. In February 2013, Douw and Carolyn remarried at the Saxon Boutique Hotel, where guests included Graça Machel, Timothy Moloi, and Michael de Pinna.

== Career ==
=== Early work: 1983–1987 ===
Steyn performed for the Performing Arts Company of Transvaal (PACT) between 1983 and 1987. During this time, Steyn performed in an adaptation of Elsa Joubert's Die Swerfjare van Poppie Nongena, in Poppie Nongena (1984) opposite Nomsa Nene. It ran for a year and received positive reviews.

=== International work: 1989–2005 ===
Steyn lived in the United States between 1989 and 1999, and in the United Kingdom between 2000 and 2005. In Los Angeles, where she was pursuing an acting career, Steyn studied at the Beverly Hills Playhouse for five years under acting coach, Milton Katselas, along with fellow students Kate Hudson, Giovanni Ribisi, Jeffrey Tambor, Tony Danza and Doris Roberts, amongst others.

During this time, Steyn appeared on Melrose Place and Babylon 5 and also appeared in numerous plays, including Private Lives, Shadowlands and Harold Pinter's Betrayal. She served on the Los Angeles guild of the children's mentorship organisation, Big Sisters, and in 2004, was nominated as one of the "Most Exciting Women" by the Beverly Hills Sheet.

=== South African work: 2006 - present ===
Since returning to South Africa, Steyn co-hosted a Radio Today show for nine years called Whispers with Carolyn Steyn and Michael de Pinna and was a host of Tongue in Cheek on SABC 3. Steyn also hosted The Classic Cocktail Hour and the Classic Lunch every weekday on Classic 1027. Steyn has been hosting Hot Classic on Hot 1027 FM.

Between 2014 and 2018, Steyn appeared on Generations, as herself, the founder of 67 Blankets for Nelson Mandela Day. In 2016, Steyn served as the executive producer of Mandela’s Gun which was nominated for four awards, winning three, at the 2018 Harlem International Film Festival in New York. Steyn played minor roles in films such as Blessers and Zulu Wedding.

Steyn previously served as a patron of the Joburg Ballet and of the Auto & General Theatre on the Square. Steyn is also a South African ambassador for Peace Starts, an organisation involved in promotion of the International Day of Peace. Steyn currently sits as a board member of the Johannesburg Philharmonic Orchestra.

== Philanthropy ==
The non-profit organization, 67 Blankets for Nelson Mandela Day, was founded by Steyn shortly after the death of the first democratically elected President of South Africa, Nelson Mandela, in December 2013 following a challenge by Mandela's former assistant, Zelda la Grange to knit or sew 67 blankets to support the annual Mandela Day. The organization was later formally launched on 27 January 2014.

Since its establishment, 67 Blankets for Nelson Mandela Day has set three Guinness World Records.

On 6 May 2021, Steyn launched the 'Carolyn Steyn Performing Arts Centre' at her alma mater, Jeppe High School for Girls.

On 30 March 2022, Steyn received the Chevalier de l’Ordre national du Mérite. It was awarded to Steyn by the ambassador of France to South Africa, Aurélien Lechevallier at the French Residence in Pretoria for her contributions related to South Africa's cultural relations with France.
