= Uswitch =

Price comparison service

Uswitch Limited
- Type: Subsidiary
- Industry: Price comparison service
- Founded: 2000; 26 years ago
- Founder: George Mountbatten, 4th Marquess of Milford Haven
- Headquarters: The Cooperage, 5 Copper Row, London, SE1,2LH, United Kingdom
- Key people: Tariq Syed (CEO)
- Number of employees: 250
- Parent: Red Ventures
- Website: uswitch.com

Uswitch Limited is a UK-based price comparison service and switching website founded in 2000. Users can conveniently compare prices across various sectors of energy, personal finance, insurance, and communications

== History ==
uSwitch.com was founded by Lord Milford Haven in September 2000 with an initial £4 million investment to take advantage of the UK's deregulated gas and electricity markets. He partnered with Andrew Salmon, and Vipul Amin. The company subsequently expanded into the telephony and communications markets in 2001. In the same year, it also bought competitor buy.co.uk followed by local community information website UpMyStreet.com in 2003.

uSwitch.com was itself acquired by US media conglomerate, E. W. Scripps Company in March 2006 for £210 million ($366 million). The purchase added a second freestanding interactive media business to its portfolio alongside leading US product price comparison site, Shopzilla.

In February 2008, E. W. Scripps Company recorded a $411 million pre-tax charge related to the uSwitch acquisition, contributing to an overall $256 million loss for Scripps in the last quarter of 2007. The scale of the write-down reflects more realistic revenue expectations due to lower-than-expected levels of switching.

In December 2009, uSwitch was acquired by Forward Internet Group for $10.3 million in cash. Forward is a privately funded collection of internet-based businesses focused on consumer engagement and innovation. Forward3D is the group's 3D search agency (formerly known as TrafficBroker) and Forward Innovations is the consumer division that focuses on price comparison and switching, including brands such as InvisibleHand and Omio.

In June 2011, uSwitch acquired Top10.com. 2011 also saw uSwitch enter the Irish market with uSwitch.ie, which operates in the same way as the UK but currently offers switching services for broadband, TV, phone, and energy services and not insurance or financial services.

In August 2013, LDC backed an MBO of uSwitch, the private equity firm acquired a significant stake in the business with Forward Internet Group retaining a substantial minority holding. Both investors aligned with the existing management team who have a minority holding in the business.

On 30 April 2015, the property website firm Zoopla agreed to purchase uSwitch from LDC for £160 million.

In 2018, Red Ventures and the investment firm Silverlake purchased Uswitch from the property giant Zoopla to create RVU, a family of brands of which Uswitch is now a part.

== Business model ==
uSwitch.com is a free, online comparison and switching service, that helps consumers compare prices on energy, finance, insurance, and other services. There are no direct costs to consumers for the service, the company instead receives a commission from some suppliers when a customer chooses to switch to them. uSwitch provides several mechanisms designed to increase suppliers' visibility for a fee.

uSwitch.com was the first comparison website to achieve the Plain English Campaign’s Internet Crystal Mark It also hosts guides advising the public on how to save money and releases research covering technology, the energy market, and financial developments.

uSwitch.com also has a London-based call centre and a Freepost ‘Send us your bill’ service, where customers can post their latest energy bills to receive comparison advice.

In January 2018, the company launched a campaign featuring Channel 4 presenter Rachel Riley in Winkleigh, Devon.

== Accreditation ==
uSwitch is accredited under the Ofgem Confidence Code, a voluntary code of practice for online domestic price comparison services. uSwitch was involved in the formation of the Confidence Code in 2002 with Consumer Focus, which managed the code until Ofgem took over in 2013. uSwitch.com was previously accredited by Consumer Focus, and played a role in the industry consultation which led to the establishment of a voluntary code of practice—the Energywatch Confidence Code (now known as the Consumer Focus Confidence Code)—in 2002.

The September 2007 minutes of the Consumer Focus Management Board Meeting, and press reports, show that the company was asked by Consumer Focus to change how it displays comparison results and information so that consumers receive unbiased results. The company complied with these requests and has remained accredited.

In Ofgem's (Office of Gas and Electricity Markets) September 2013 audit of the uSwitch.com website, it scored 100% for each of the nine code of practice requirements of the Confidence Code.

== Partners and affiliates ==
Major partners include Yahoo, AOL, Orange, Virgin Media, People's Champion and Johnston Press.

== See also ==
- MoneySuperMarket
- Go.Compare
- Compare the Market
- Confused.com
