= Hayley Parsons =

Welsh entrepreneur and investor

Hayley Parsons OBE
- Born: November 22, 1973 (age 51); Cwmbran, Wales
- Occupation: Businesswoman
- Known for: Founded Gocompare.com

Hayley Parsons OBE (born 22 November 1973) is a Welsh entrepreneur and investor, most notable as the founder of British financial services comparison website GoCompare.

== Early life ==
Born and brought up in Cwmbran South Wales, Parsons began working in the insurance sector aged sixteen after leaving school.

== Career ==
In 1992 she began working for Cardiff based Admiral Group and where she launched price comparison site Confused.com.

In 2006 she left Confused.com to found Go.Compare.

In 2014, Parsons joined the Entrepreneurship Panel for Wales to advise the Welsh Government on the development and promotion of entrepreneurship in Wales. She is a key figure in the BeTheSpark movement, which promotes entrepreurship in Wales.

She is a member of the Inspire Growth Wales investment consortium, which invests in and mentors technology-focused start-ups and businesses in Wales.

== Awards and recognition ==
Parsons was winner of the 'Woman in Business' award at the South Wales Chamber of Commerce Business Awards 2009. She also won the Western Mail's 'Welsh Woman in Innovation Award' in 2008, and the 'Business Leader' category in the Inspire Wales Awards 2010. The awards, which are organised by the Institute of Welsh Affairs, recognise the role that Welsh residents play in encouraging active citizenship and in promoting their communities on a local, regional, national and global scale.

Parsons was appointed an Officer of the Order of the British Empire (OBE) for services to the economy in the 2012 New Year Honours.
