= Mockumentary =

Comedic film and television genre

A mockumentary (a portmanteau of mock and documentary) is a type of film or television programme depicting fictional events, but presented as a documentary. Mockumentaries are often used to analyse or comment on current events and issues in a satirical way by using a fictional setting, or to parody the documentary form itself. One of the most well known examples of the modern time is The Office. The term originated in the 1960s but was popularised in the mid-1990s when This Is Spinal Tap director Rob Reiner used it in interviews to describe that film.

While mockumentaries are comedic, pseudo-documentaries are their dramatic equivalents. Pseudo-documentary should not be confused with docudrama, a fictional genre in which dramatic techniques are combined with documentary elements to depict real events. Nor should either of those be confused with docufiction, a genre in which documentaries are contaminated with fictional elements.

Mockumentaries are often presented as historical documentaries, with B roll and talking heads discussing past events, or as cinéma vérité pieces following people as they go through various events. Examples emerged during the 1950s when archival film footage became available. A very early example was a short piece on the "Swiss spaghetti harvest" that appeared as an April Fools' prank on the British television program Panorama in 1957.

Mockumentaries can be partly or wholly improvised.

== Early examples ==
Early work, including Luis Buñuel's 1933 Land Without Bread, Orson Welles's 1938 radio broadcast of The War of the Worlds, various April Fools' Day news reports, and vérité-style film and television during the 1960s and 1970s, served as precursor to the genre. Early examples of mock-documentaries include various films by Peter Watkins, such as The War Game (1965), Privilege (1967), and the dystopic Punishment Park (1971). the Beatles' film A Hard Day's Night (1964) also contains elements of the genre, and is often considered as being an early example.

Further examples are The Connection (1961), David Holzman's Diary (1967), Pat Paulsen for President (1968), Take the Money and Run (1969), The Clowns (1970) by Federico Fellini (a peculiar hybrid of documentary and fiction, a docufiction), Smile (1975), Carlos Mayolo's The Vampires of Poverty (1977) and All You Need Is Cash (1978). Albert Brooks was also an early popularizer of the mockumentary style with his film Real Life, 1979, a spoof of the 1973 reality television series An American Family. Woody Allen's Take the Money and Run is presented in documentary style with Allen playing a fictional criminal, Virgil Starkwell, whose crime exploits are "explored" throughout the film. Jackson Beck, who used to narrate documentaries in the 1940s, provides the voice-over narration. Fictional interviews are inter-spliced throughout, especially those of Starkwell's parents who wear Groucho Marx noses and mustaches. The style of this film was widely appropriated by others and revisited by Allen himself in films such as Men of Crisis: The Harvey Wallinger Story (1971), Zelig (1983) and Sweet and Lowdown (1999).

Early use of the mockumentary format in television comedy can be seen in several sketches from Monty Python's Flying Circus (1969–1974), such as "Hell's Grannies", "Piranha Brothers", and "The Funniest Joke in the World". The Hart and Lorne Terrific Hour (1970–1971) also featured mockumentary pieces that interspersed both scripted and real-life man-in-the-street interviews, the most famous likely being "The Puck Crisis" in which hockey pucks were claimed to have become infected with a form of Dutch elm disease.

All You Need Is Cash, developed from an early series of sketches in the comedy series Rutland Weekend Television, is a 1978 television film in mockumentary style about The Rutles, a fictional band that parodies the Beatles.

== Since 1980 ==
=== In film and television ===
Since the beginning of the 1980s, the mockumentary format has gained considerable attention. Mockumentaries have also been studied for their ability to blur distinctions between fiction and factual media, often encouraging audiences to question the authority and authenticity of documentary storytelling. The 1980 South African film The Gods Must be Crazy (along with its 1989 sequel) is presented in the manner of a nature documentary, with documentary narrator Paddy O'Byrne describing the events of the film in the manner of a biologist or anthropologist presenting scientific knowledge to viewers. The Atomic Cafe (1983) is a Cold-War era American "mockumentary" film that made use of archival government footage from the 1950s. Woody Allen's 1983 film Zelig stars Allen as a curiously nondescript enigma who is discovered for his remarkable ability to transform himself to resemble anyone he is near, and Allen is edited into historical archive footage. In 1984, Christopher Guest co-wrote and starred in the mockumentary This Is Spinal Tap, directed by Rob Reiner. Guest went on to write and direct other mockumentaries including Waiting for Guffman, Best in Show, and A Mighty Wind, all written with costar Eugene Levy.

In Central Europe, the first time that viewers were exposed to mockumentary was in 1988 when the Czechoslovak short film Oil Gobblers was shown. For two weeks, TV viewers believed that the oil-eating animals really existed.

Tim Robbins' 1992 film Bob Roberts was a mockumentary centered around the senatorial campaign of a right-wing stock trader and folksinger, and the unsavory connections and dirty tricks used to defeat a long-term liberal incumbent played by Gore Vidal. Man Bites Dog is a 1992 Belgian black comedy crime mockumentary written, produced, and directed by Rémy Belvaux, André Bonzel, and Benoît Poelvoorde. In 1995, Peter Jackson and Costa Botes directed Forgotten Silver, which claimed New Zealand "director" Colin McKenzie was a pioneer in filmmaking. When the film was later revealed to be a mockumentary, Jackson received criticism for tricking viewers.

Borat! Cultural Learnings of America for Make Benefit Glorious Nation of Kazakhstan from 2006, and its 2020 sequel Borat Subsequent Moviefilm, are two controversial yet successful films that use this style, as does Brüno, a similar film from 2009 also starring Sacha Baron Cohen. Sony Pictures Animation released their second animated feature, Surf's Up in 2007, which was the first of its kind to incorporate the mockumentary style into animation.

Ivo Raza's 2020 mockumentary Reboot Camp is a comedy about a fake cult that uses an ensemble cast of celebrities from the film (David Koechner, Eric Roberts, Chaz Bono, Ed Begley Jr.), performing arts (Ja Rule, Billy Morrison), and TV (Lindsey Shaw, Pierson Fode, Johnny Bananas) to play fictional versions of themselves.

In television, the most notable mockumentaries in the 2000s have been ABC Australia's The Games (1998–2000), the Canadian series Trailer Park Boys (1999–present), the British shows Marion and Geoff (2000), Twenty Twelve (2011–2012) (which follows the fictional Olympic Deliverance Commission in the run-up to the 2012 Summer Olympics), and W1A, which follows the main characters of Twenty Twelve as they start work at the BBC, as well as The Office (2001) and its many international offshoots, and Come Fly with Me (2010), which follows the activity at a fictional airport and its variety of staff and passengers. British comedy duo Jennifer Saunders and Dawn French often presented short mockumentaries as extended sketches in their TV show French & Saunders. Discovery Channel opened its annual Shark Week on 4 Aug 2013 with Megalodon: The Monster Shark Lives, a mockumentary about the survival of the megalodon. The Canadian series Trailer Park Boys and its films (1998–present) were one of the first mainstream examples of Canadian mockumentaries. Popular examples in the United States include sitcoms The Office (2005–2013), Parks and Recreation (2009–2015), and Modern Family (2009–2020); the American improv comedy Reno 911! (2003–2009); Derek (2012–2014); the comedy series The Muppets (2015); People Just Do Nothing (2011–2018), What We Do in the Shadows (2019–2024), and the Australian Chris Lilley shows Angry Boys, Summer Heights High, We Can Be Heroes: Finding the Australian of the Year, Ja'mie: Private School Girl, Jonah from Tonga and Lunatics. Shows currently running in this format include Abbott Elementary (2021–present), and St. Denis Medical (2024–present). Strictly speaking, a mockumentary refers to films, while the term "comedy verite" refers to TV series, though term is widely used here.

The series Documentary Now! (2015–2022) on IFC, created by Saturday Night Live alumni Bill Hader, Fred Armisen, and Seth Meyers, spoofs celebrated documentary films by parodying the style and subject of each documentary. Hight argues that television is a natural medium for a mockumentary, as it provides for "extraordinarily rich sources of appropriation and commentary".

In 2018, the BBC released the series Cunk on Britain created by Charlie Brooker and starring Diane Morgan about British history with Philomena Cunk, an extremely dim-witted and ill-informed interviewer, asking various experts ridiculous questions. The follow-up Cunk on Earth featuring a similar plot was released by BBC Two in 2022 and is available on Netflix.

=== On radio ===
The BBC series People Like Us was first produced for radio in 1995 before a television version was made in 1999. Kay Stonham's Audio Diaries was a similarly short tenured radio mockumentary that premiered the year after People Like Us's run on Radio 4 ended.

== See also ==
- List of mockumentaries
- Comedy verite
- Docudrama – a fictional recreation of past events
- Docufiction – a blend of documentary and fiction
- Documentary comedy
- Found footage (pseudo-documentary)
- Mockbuster
- Mondo film - a type of exploitative documentary
- News satire
- Pseudo-documentary – a fake documentary, often presented as real
