= London Road Stadium =

Football stadium

Weston Homes Stadium
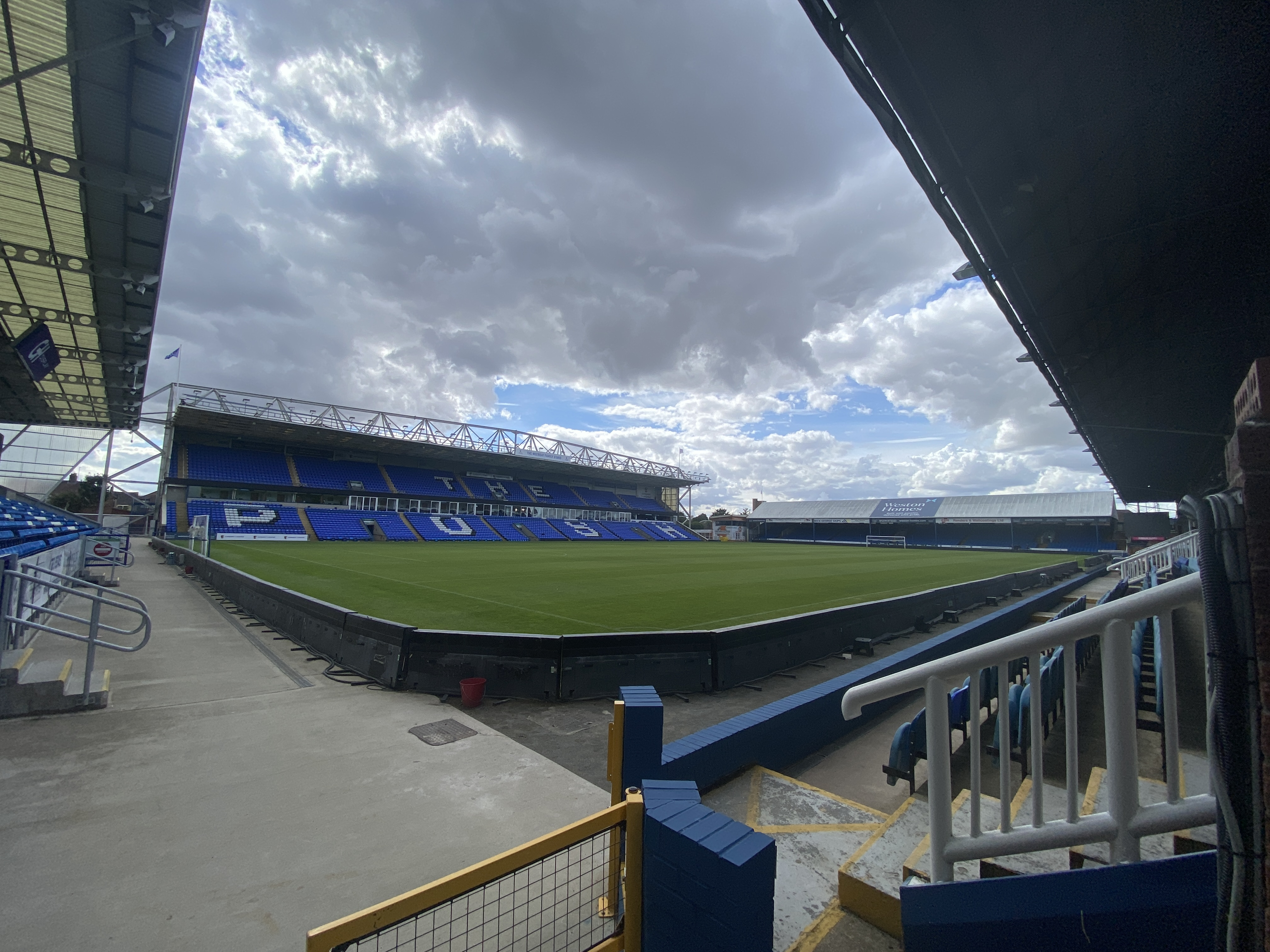
- London Road on 28 August 2025
- Interactive map of Weston Homes Stadium
- Full name: London Road Stadium
- Former names: ABAX Stadium (2014–2019)
- Location: London Road, Peterborough, PE2 8AL
- Coordinates: 52°33′53″N 0°14′25″W
- Capacity: 13,512
- Field size: 112 by 76 yards (102.4 m × 69.5 m)
- Public transit: Peterborough (0.9 mi)

Construction
- Built: 1913
- Opened: 1913

Tenants
- Peterborough & Fletton United (1923–1932); Peterborough United (1934–present)

London Road, currently known as the Weston Homes Stadium for sponsorship reasons, is a multi-purpose stadium in Peterborough, England. The stadium is in Fletton, south of the River Nene. It is currently used mostly for football matches and is the home ground of Peterborough United. The stadium holds 13,511 and was built pre-1891, though the present ground bears no resemblance to the original following several periods of redevelopment.

== History ==
The stadium was built and opened in the early 1890s, consisting of a single wooden stand with a capacity of just 250, and it was replaced in 1923 with a 650-seater stand. It was owned by the city council and taken over by Peterborough United following their formation in 1934. The council built brick dressing rooms and a committee room at the back of the wooden stand to support the club. These survived until the 1950s, when the North Stand was constructed.

The two goal ends were the next to be built. Many home fans had traditionally stood at the London Road End, so a covered standing terrace was constructed there just before the Second World War. A similar structure was built at the Moy's End at around the same time.

Financial difficulties during the war years meant that the city council very nearly terminated the ground lease. Another local sports club almost took a 10-year lease, but Peterborough United were saved in 1942 by two individuals who paid the £50 owed in rent by the club.

In the 1950s, the council sold London Road to the club following a long-term lease, and it was at this time that major development of the ground began. In 1953, the Moy's End was refurbished with new covered terracing and a similar improvement was made at the London Road End just over a year later. A new stand, with 2,404 seats and standing room in the front, was constructed behind the old wooden stand in 1956 and opened in time for the 1957–58 season. The wooden stand was demolished, leaving a gap of 30 yards between the new Main (North) Stand and the pitch (the pitch was moved back the following season).

A new standing terrace was then built at the Glebe Road (southern) side of the stadium shortly after the completion of the Main Stand. Four executive boxes, along with a television platform, would later be added to the structure. Floodlights were added to the stadium in 1960, with four pylons erected at each corner of the ground. Joe Richards, who was then chairman of Football League, performed the switching-on ceremony. The first match in which the floodlights were used was against Arsenal in February 1960.

Following the club's promotion to the First Division in 1992, the Main Stand was forced to undergo re-development. This was because the stadium's seated capacity was below the level required by the Taylor Report. To solve this problem, the stand's terraces were converted to seats, with 700 of these new seats were bought second hand from Leicester City following the re-development of their Filbert Street stadium. Another 300 seats were taken from Millwall's stadium, The Den. Millwall were about to move into a new stadium themselves. With a capacity of 3,605, the Main Stand's facilities were improved to include a pub, conference areas and a retail shop.

Due to increased support, a new stand was constructed on the Glebe Road side of the ground. The two-tiered South Stand, with a capacity of 5,000, opened in time for the end of the 1995–96 season. The Football Trust contributed roughly £900,000 to the project. The stand was initially sponsored by Freemans and then by Thomas Cook. It was then called the Norwich and Peterborough Family Stand, due to a deal with the Norwich and Peterborough Building Society.

The new millennium saw the London Road End and Moy's End fitted with new roofs and crush barriers to comply with safety requirements. The pitch received a large makeover in 2001 when the entire playing surface was removed to insert 1 1/4 miles (2.0 km) of new drainage pipes and 500 tons of gravel and sand.

In 2014 the Norwegian company ABAX signed a five-year sponsorship deal worth £500,000 and the stadium was renamed the ABAX Stadium .

In August 2017, the club announced that BGL Group become the new sponsor of the south stand with it to be known as the "BGL Family Stand". This deal is set to last three years until 2020 and follows on from previous partnerships between The Posh and BGL Group where BGL sponsored both the teams Foundation as well as the First Team shorts in years previous.

When the FA submitted their bid for England to host the 2021 Women's European Championship, London Road was listed as a host venue. However, when the bid was successful, plans had to change as London Road did not meet UEFA regulations.

On 1 June 2019, the ground was renamed the Weston Homes Stadium as part of a ten-year £2 million sponsorship deal.

== Capacity ==
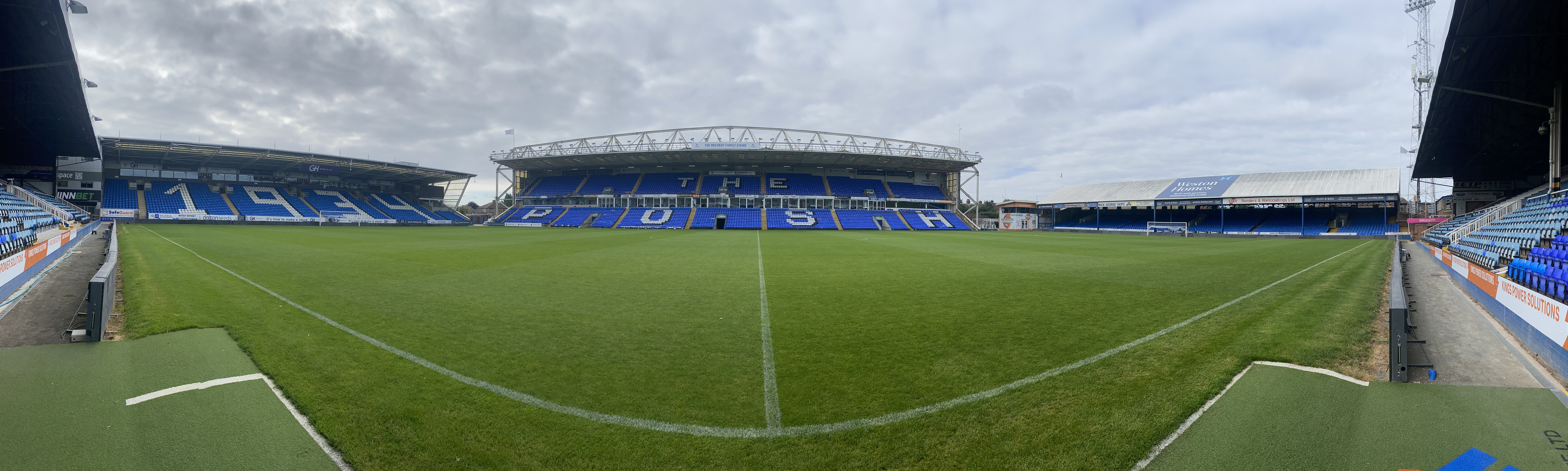
The stadium viewed from King Power Solutions Stand in August 2024

Stand	Capacity
Meerkat Family Stand	4,637
Kings Power Solutions Stand	4,142
Weston Homes London Road End (rail seating)	2,175
GH Display Stand	2,557

The record attendance at the stadium currently stands at 30,096, during a 1965 FA Cup tie with Swansea Town. This is unlikely to be beaten in the near future as it was set when most of the ground consisted of terracing. The record attendance since the capacity dropped to 13,511 (prior to seating of London Road end) is 14,110, which was set during a match with Leicester City in March 2009.

== Stands ==
=== Main North Stand ===
Currently known as The King Power Solutions Stand for sponsorship reasons seats 2,254 home supporters and 1,888 away supporters.

=== London Road End ===
The traditional home end terrace had 2,175 rail seats, which permit safe standing, installed in the summer of 2022.

=== Glebe Road ===
Currently known as the Meerkat Family Stand for sponsorship purposes, the stand is a two tiered 4,637 capacity stand to the south of the pitch. It houses some of the home supporters, and is the largest stand in the stadium. The current two tiered structure was opened in 1996, and was previously an open aired terrace.

=== GH Display Stand ===
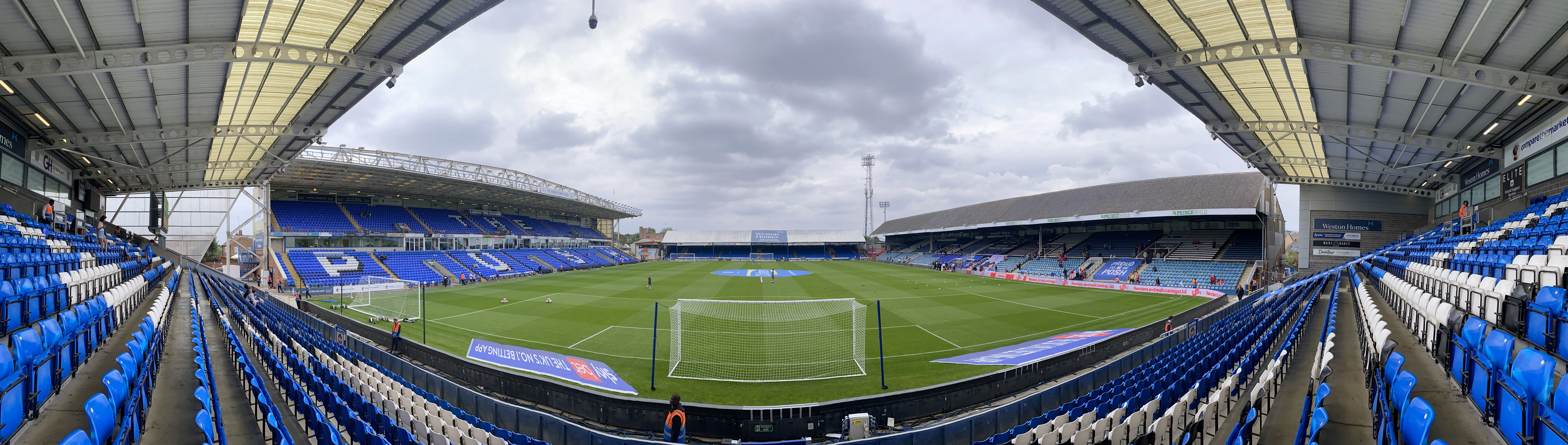
The stadium viewed from GH Display in 31 August 2024

Currently known as the GH Display Stand for sponsorship purposes, the stand is a single tiered 2,557 capacity stand to the east of the pitch. The stand was completed in 2014 replacing the previous Moy's End Terrace, with plans for the stands construction being unveiled in 2010.

In 2019, a new jumbo screen was added to the stand, operating for the first time in a game against Ipswich Town.

== Future ==
Prior to the club's promotion to the Championship in 2009, there had been talks about the possibility of a new stadium. After 'The Posh' were promoted, the chairman, Darragh MacAnthony, promised that a new stadium would be built if the club could maintain their Championship status for several seasons. These plans were still in the feasibility stage at the time. If built, the stadium would have been all-seater and would have had a capacity of between 15,000 and 25,000. However, the club's relegation a year later put these plans on hold. Though they have since regained their Championship status, the whole prospect of either significant development or a new stadium remains an issue.

In September 2010, plans were unveiled for a new stand to be constructed at the Moy's End. This will be the first phase of the redevelopment of London Road, the aim being to turn it into an all-seater stadium, that will meet Premier League criteria. Construction of the stand was set to be complete by mid-2012, but as of March 2013 construction had not started. The project is set to be funded through a combination of a central government grant and private finance and will include a new further education facility – a STEM centre.

In July 2013, an agreement was reached between the club and Peterborough City Council concerning rent and the redevelopment of the ground. This provided for the club to pay reduced rent during redevelopment of the ground, with work on the Moy's End expected to start in September 2013. An additional £1 million fund was also provided to retrofit the London Road End with seats. In December 2013 demolition work started on the Moy's End terraced end of the ground which was expected to take a year to complete.

== Other uses ==
London Road was the venue for three professional boxing events between 1929 and 1948. In 1939, more than 18,000 people watched Eric 'Fen Tiger' Boon successfully defend his British lightweight boxing title at London Road against Johnny McGrory of Scotland. Since then, there have not been many other major events at the stadium, although it occasionally hosts small concerts. Westlife were scheduled to perform in the stadium on 21 June 2020 for their "Stadiums in the Summer Tour"; this was cancelled as a result of the COVID-19 pandemic.

== See also ==
- List of stadiums in the United Kingdom by capacity
- Lists of stadiums
