= Compare the Market Australia =

Price comparison website

- Type: Private
- Industry: Finance & Insurance
- Founded: 2012
- Headquarters: Brisbane, Australia
- Products: Health insurance; Vehicle insurance; Home insurance; Travel insurance; Life insurance; Pet insurance; Income protection insurance
- Website: comparethemarket.com.au

Comparethemarket.com.au is an Australian price comparison website operated by Compare the Market Pty Ltd, part of Innovation Holdings Australia Pty Ltd and BHL Holdings Limited. It offers a service for customers to compare a range of general insurance, health insurance, life insurance, energy and personal finance products.

The company is well known for its ‘Compare the Meerkat’ marketing campaign created by communications agency VCCP and starring CGI Russian billionaire meerkat Aleksandr Orlov, voiced by Simon Greenall.

== History in Australia ==
Comparethemarket.com.au was launched in Australia in 2012, six years after the launch of Compare the Market in the United Kingdom. Using the comparethemarket.com.au service, Australian customers can compare a number of products based on price, features, and more. These products include health insurance, car insurance, and energy.

In 2015, the company signed a deal to secure Bupa, one of Australia's largest health insurers, as a participating health fund. The deal ensured that Bupa products could be compared on comparethemarket.com.au, alongside products from health funds like ahm (owned by Medibank) and HBF Health Fund.

Comparethemarket.com.au was the first commercial comparison website in Australia to disclose the amount of commission it receives from participating health funds. As of 2016, the standardised flat fee equated to a net present value of 27.75 percent of the first-year premium of the health insurance product sold by the company.

Comparethemarket.com.au continues to compete against other comparison services in Australia, like iSelect and Choosi.

== Meerkat campaign ==
Compare the Market is perhaps best known for its marketing campaigns featuring meerkat characters Aleksandr Orlov and his Head of IT, Sergei. The meerkat advertisements started with Aleksandr Orlov's mission to clear the confusion up for Australians who mistook his website comparethemeerkat.com.au for comparethemarket.com.au.

The same marketing campaign was launched years earlier in the United Kingdom for comparethemarket.com, which ended up topping a Nielsen consumer poll to be dubbed “UK’s most loved ad”. As of 2017, the UK business continues to use these characters in their own marketing.

Another meerkat character, Baby Oleg, was introduced in August 2015. The storyline continued with Aleksandr Orlov buying the Compare the Market business, and introduced a human character named Tom. In 2017, the company launched a limited run of meerkat toys for their health insurance customers.

Aleksandr's catchphrase, “simples”, is so well known that it can be found in both the Macmillan English dictionary, as well as the Oxford English Dictionary.
