= General Bugantra =

Nigerian actor

- Born: Balogun Lookman Ayo; 8 February 1980 (age 46); Lagos island, Lagos, Nigeria
- Citizenship: Nigerian
- Education: University of Lagos
- Occupations: Actor; filmmaker; director; producer
- Years active: 2018–present
- Known for: Motigbo, Aije Yalemi, Back to Sender, Bone of my Bones, Boomerang, Barbers Shop.

Balogun Lookman Ayo, known as General Bugantra (born 8 February 1980), is a Nigerian film producer and actor. He participates mainly in the Nollywood movie industry.

== Early life ==
Bugantra was born and raised in Lagos, Nigeria to the family of Chief & Mrs Balogun. He attended A.D.R.O primary school, Ipaja (1985), Command secondary school, Ipaja and further advanced to study medicine in University of Lagos (UNILAG) in 2001. He found his passion of production and theatre arts while in the university.

== Career ==
He started production in Nollywood with a movie in 2018 titled Motigbo( I have heard). Bugantra with a Bachelor in Theatre Arts degree honor from London Film Academy has also produced movies such as Aije Yalemi (2019) & Back to sender (2019).

== Filmography ==
Balogun Lukman Ayo has produced in Nollywood movies. Amongst them are:.

- Motigbo (2018)
- Aije Yalemi (2019)
- Back to sender (2019)
- Bone of my bones (2020)
- Boomerang (2020)
- Barbers shop (2020)
