= Robin and Wendy's Wet Weekends =

- Other names: Robin And Wendy's Wet Edinburgh Weekend
- Genre: Situation comedy
- Running time: 30 minutes
- Country of origin: United Kingdom
- Language(s): English
- Home station: BBC Radio 4
- Starring: Simon Greenall; Kay Stonham; Phil Cornwell; Debra Stephenson; Martin Trenaman; Amelia Bullmore; Brian Capron
- Written by: Kay Stonham; Simon Greenall
- Produced by: Mario Stylianides; Claire Bartlett
- Original release: 28 December 2001 – 12 August 2005
- No. of series: 4
- No. of episodes: 19
- Audio format: Stereophonic sound
- Opening theme: Little Boxes by Malvina Reynolds (sung by Kay Stonham)

Robin and Wendy's Wet Weekends is a BBC Radio 4 comedy series written by and starring Kay Stonham and Simon Greenall, which ran from 2001 to 2005. It revolves around the mundane lives of Robin and Wendy Mayfield who live on an anonymous housing estate in Stevenage. Robin tends to be self-centred, demanding and controlling in his relationships. Wendy, however, always seems to see the positive side of any situation, and, while often frustrated, copes with Robin admirably. Both Robin and Wendy have relatively meaningless bureaucratic jobs. Robin manages shipping and receiving for a warehouse, and Wendy works in local government.

To their disappointment (mainly Wendy's), they find themselves unable to have children. Consequently, their considerable energies are channeled into building and maintaining Mayfield, the model village in their garage. Robin drives a decrepit Triumph Herald, claiming it to be a "classic British car". Wendy becomes pregnant in the penultimate episode of Series 3, due to an affair with a patient at the hospital where Robin lies in a coma after an accident at work. The arrival of the baby is a major element in Series 4.

Their next-door neighbours Derek and Maureen also have no children, although Derek has children from a previous marriage. Before suffering burnout and a breakdown, Derek was a legend among salesmen. Now he is usually undergoing treatment with one or more drugs to address his psychological problems, which often trigger erratic behavior when he takes too much or too little. Maureen tends to be involved in the latest get-rich-quick scheme, although none of them turn out to be too successful. To make matters worse, she dumped her previous husband for Derek, and openly regrets having done so.

Each episode focuses on one particular event or activity and details the usually absurd outcome brought about by the group. The humour is gentle, yet the storylines encourage sympathy for the characters.

The first series was broadcast on BBC Radio 4 in 2001. Four series and one special, a total of 19 episodes, have been broadcast up to the end of 2005. Early episodes were co-written by Kay Stonham, who also plays Wendy, and Simon Greenall who played Robin. In the third and fourth series Robin was played by Brian Capron and Kay Stonham was the sole credited writer.

The show is repeated from time to time on BBC Radio 4 Extra and occasionally on Radio 4.

== Critical reaction ==
The Financial Times called it "wonderfully nerdish... a dash of Ayckbourn tinged with Mike Leigh, only loopier." The Times called it "gently humorous, rather sad, slightly surreal".

== Episode list ==
Series	Episode	Title	First broadcast
1	1	The Heinrich Manoeuvre	28 December 2001
1	2	A Fete Worse Than Death	4 January 2002
1	3	A Cavalier Attitude	11 January 2002
1	4	Police, Camera, Amphibian	18 January 2002
Special		Robin & Wendy's Wet Edinburgh Weekend	20 August 2002
2	1	Them and Us	16 May 2003
2	2	Take the High Road	23 May 2003
2	3	Entertaining Mr Stone	30 May 2003
2	4	Lassie Go Home	6 June 2003
2	5	A Green Unpleasant Land	13 June 2003
2	6	About Some Boys	20 June 2003
3	1	Alka Salsa	25 June 2004
3	2	Dream Genie	2 July 2004
3	3	Arrivederci Coma	9 July 2004
3	4	Anniversary Waltz	16 July 2004
4	1	Autumn Crocus	22 July 2005
4	2	Congratulations, It's a Hob Nob	29 July 2005
4	3	Baby Love	5 August 2005
4	4	Ground Control to Major Derek	12 August 2005
