= MyVoucherCodes =

British Online voucher code company

- Type: Subsidiary
- Industry: Marketing
- Founded: 2006; 20 years ago in Croydon, Surrey, United Kingdom
- Founder: Mark Pearson
- Headquarters: London, United Kingdom
- Area served: France, Germany, United States, Italy, Spain, Netherlands
- Key people: Chris Reilly (Managing Director)
- Services: Voucher Codes
- Revenue: £12.85 million (2016/17)
- Owner: Go.Compare
- Website: Official website

MyVoucherCodes.co.uk is a British online voucher code company that distributes online voucher or coupons to promote its customers products. The company was acquired by Go.Compare in 2017 which, has been part of Future plc since 2021.

== History ==
MyVoucherCodes.co.uk launched by Mark Pearson in 2006 in his bedroom with £300. He initially started a company that delivered printed messages on roses called Roses by Design, but moved into vouchers after he found he was making more money promoting others products rather than his own and noticed there were no coupon sites in the UK. Initially, Pearson paid someone to build a website and then set up a tech team based in Rotherham, and once the site started making money, a sales team in Glasgow. In the first year MyVoucherCodes had a turnover of £300,000.

In 2011 the company bought VouChaCha, which became their mobile location-based player, and the following year they bought Last Second Tickets, a discounted tickets reseller for sport, events, and attractions. In the first half of the decade they also expanded to France, Germany, and United States, and then to Italy, Spain, and Netherlands.

In June 2014, after suffering a significant drop in revenue from £8m to £4.5m due to Google Algorithm changes, he sold parent company Markco Media to Monitise for £55m in an all-shares deal, including earnouts. Pearson owned 100% of the business, having grown it by using the positive cashflow rather than taking investment.

Next, the company started to focus on mobile traffic. By 2014 60,000 businesses were using MyVoucherCodes.

In early 2017 MyVoucherCodes acquired Happiour, a geo-location based app that offered consumers local food and drink offers. Between 2015 and 2017 the company made YouTube ads with students from the School of Communication Arts on a budget of £700 that parodied the John Lewis Christmas TV ads.

In July 2017, Monitise, the parent company of MyVoucherCodes was acquired by US financial services provider Fiserv. In December 2017, UK price comparison website GoCompare.com announced it was buying MyVoucherCodes for £36.5m.

== Recognition ==
- The Masters of Marketing Awards 2017 - #BudgetBuster
- PRCA South East and East Anglia Awards - Digital and Social Media Campaign of the Year
