= Simon Greenall =

British actor (born 1958)

- Born: Simon James Greenall; 3 January 1958 (age 68); Longtown, Cumberland, England
- Occupations: Actor; presenter; producer; writer
- Years active: 1986–present
- Notable work: Trapped! Octonauts

Simon James Greenall (born 3 January 1958) is an English actor. Among his television appearances are as the Caretaker on Trapped!, Richard in Lucy Sullivan is Getting Married, and as Michael the Geordie in the Alan Partridge programmes and films. He also voices Captain Barnacles in the Octonauts franchise, the twins in the Shaun the Sheep films, and Aleksandr Orlov and Sergei the meerkats in the Compare the Market adverts.

== Early life ==
Greenall was born on 3 January 1958 in Longtown, Cumberland. He attended the Manchester School of Theatre at the same time as Steve Coogan, who was two years below him and would later become a repeat collaborator.

== Career ==
Greenall has appeared in a number of television shows, shorts, movies, and video games. Earlier roles include as policemen in Life Without George (1987), One Foot in the Grave (1990), and Between the Lines (1993); as various characters in Alexei Sayle's Merry-Go-Round (1994); Harry Enfield and Chums (1998), Pond Life (2000), and Monkey Dust (2003); and as the voices of Mr. Bump, Mr. Quiet, Mr. Strong, Mr. Grumpy, Mr. Bounce and Mr. Happy in The Mr. Men Show (2008). He voiced Murgo in the Fable video game franchise and replaced Cam Clarke in Final Fantasy XIV as the voice of Lord Lolorito, in addition to his regular voiceover role the dragon Nidhogg. In the 2006 Doctor Who episode "Love & Monsters", he played Mr. Skinner.

Greenall has also starred on the BBC Radio shows On the Blog, Missing Hancocks, and The Simon Day Show. He won Celebrity Mastermind in 2015 with the specialist subject D-Day landings and was credited as co-executive producer of the 2011 film adaptation of We Need to Talk About Kevin. He currently voices Aleksandr Orlov the meerkat in the Compare the Market adverts.

When Grant Bovey was training for a BBC charity boxing match against Ricky Gervais, Greenall was one of Bovey's sparring partners. In 1995, he won a Writers' Guild of Great Britain Awards honour in the TV - Light Entertainment category along with Harry Enfield, Geoffrey Perkins, Harry Thompson, Paul Whitehouse, Ian Hislop, Nick Newman and Kay Stonham for Harry Enfield's Television Programme. In 2014, he was awarded an honorary fellowship from the University of Cumbria.

== Selected filmography ==
=== Film ===
Year(s)	Title	Role	Ref
1999	Tube Tales	Business Man (segment: "Mouth")	
2002	My Wrongs 8245-8249 and 117	Father in Church	
2003	Anglian Lives: Alan Partridge	Roy from Caistor-St-Edmonds (voice)	
2004	Wimbledon	Chauffeur	
2007	Biffovision	BW	
2010	D.O.A	Priest	
2011	Holy Flying Circus	Barry Atkins, Pub Landlord	
2011	Pythagasaurus	Pythagasaurus (voice)	
2012	Acts of Godfrey	DCI Stevens	
2012	The Cow That Almost Missed Christmas	Various roles (voices)	
2013	Alan Partridge: Alpha Papa	Michael	
2014	Harry & Paul's Story of the 2s	Various roles	
2015	Shaun the Sheep Movie	Twins (voices)	
2018	Early Man	Eemak, Thongo (voices)	
2021	Octonauts: The Ring of Fire	Captain Barnacles (voice)	
2021	Shaun the Sheep: The Flight Before Christmas	The Twins	
2021	Hilda and the Mountain King	Additional voices	
2022	The Lovebox in Your Living Room	Various roles	
2026	Shaun the Sheep: The Beast of Mossy Bottom	The Twins	

=== Television ===
Year(s)	Title	Role	No. of episodes	Ref
1993	Newman and Baddiel in Pieces	Various characters	8	
1995–1996	The Slow Norris	Bertie the frog		
1997–1998	Armstrong and Miller	Various roles	13	
1997–1998	Alas Smith & Jones	Various roles	12	
1997–2002	I'm Alan Partridge	Michael, Robert Moon	12	
1998	Alexei Sayle's Merry-Go-Round	Various roles	1	
1998	Barking	Various roles	5	
1998	Big Train	Various roles	2	
1999	Boyz Unlimited	Benny Van Hoere	3	
1999–2000	Lucy Sullivan is Getting Married	Richard	16	
2000	Harry Enfield's Brand Spanking New Show	Various roles	12	
2000	Kiss Me Kate	Colin	1	
2001	Time Gentlemen Please	Arnold Poncett	1	
2001	World of Pub	Various roles	6	
2001	The Armando Iannucci Shows	Various roles	1	
2003	Monkey Dust	Various roles	18	
2003	Fortysomething	Ashley Ramp	1	
2003–2005	Trevor's World of Sport	VDK, Lance	3	
2004	Swiss Toni	Peter Gellward	1	
2004	Doc Martin	Philip Rowe	1	
2005	Funland	Ken Cryer	2	
2005	Don't Watch That, Watch This	Various roles	2	
2005	Bromwell High	Martin Jackson, Iqbal Kandallah, Additional voices	13	
2006	Doctor Who	Mr. Skinner	1	
2006	Lead Balloon	Adam Greene	1	
2006	Popetown	Cardinal Three (voice)	10	
2006–2008	Star Stories	Narrator (voice)	7	
2007	Saxondale	Malcolm	1	
2007–2010	Trapped!	Caretaker	52	
2008	Secret Diary of a Call Girl	Ian Farringdon	1	
2008	The Wrong Door	Various roles	6	
2008	Brain-Jitsu	Sensei	25	
2008	The Mr. Men Show	Mr. Happy (Season 1), Mr. Bounce, Mr. Bump, Mr. Grumpy, Mr. Happy, Mr. Quiet, Mr. Strong	104	
2008	No Heroics	Isobar	1	
2009	Horne & Corden	Various roles	1	
2009–2011	The Impressions Show with Culshaw and Stephenson	Various roles	19	
2010	Life of Riley	Mr. Smith	1	
2010–2011	Pete Versus Life	Colin King	11	
2010–2012	Ruddy Hell! It's Harry and Paul	Various roles	9	
2010–2016	Mid Morning Matters with Alan Partridge	Caller (voice)	12	
2010–2017	Octonauts	Captain Barnacles	122	
2011	PhoneShop	The Greeter	1	
2011	Comedy Blaps	Various characters	3	
2012	Spy	Quiz host	1	
2013	Common Ground	Peter the Polish Park Keeper	2	
2013	It's Kevin	Various roles	2	
2013	Drifters	Davide	1	
2013	Hebburn	Bob Muirfield	2	
2014	Inspector George Gently	Peter Turner	1	
2014	W1A	Nigel Trescott	1	
2014	Cardinal Burns	Various roles	3	
2014	Fried	Derek	1	
2015	The Keith Lemon Sketch Show	Narrator	1	
2015	Car Share	Dave Thompson (voice)	1	
2015	Hoff the Record	Radovan Merkadic	1	
2016	Plebs	Announcer	1	
2015–2016	Newzoids	Various roles	12	
2016	The Windsors	Various roles	2	
2017	Benidorm	Neville	5	
2017	Ill Behaviour	Liam's Dad	2	
2017–2020	The Other One	Colin	3	
2020	Shaun the Sheep: Adventures from Mossy Bottom	Various roles	20	
2020	Mister Winner	Racing Commentator	1	
2022	Meet the Richardsons	Simon Greenall	1	
2022	The Thief, His Wife and the Canoe	Coroner	1	

=== Video games ===
Year(s)	Title	Role	Ref
1997	Tomb Raider II	Claudio, Fabio, Brother Chan Barkhang (voices)	
2000	Shogun: Total War		
2000	Team Buddies		
2000	Who Wants to Be a Millionaire: 2nd Edition		
2001	Original War		
2002	Hard Hitter Tennis	Bob Conner (voice)	
2004	Future Tactics: The Uprising		
2004	Fable	Fisherman (voice)	
2004	Dragon Quest VIII	Additional voices	English Version
2005	Ape Escape 3	Monkey Blue (voice)	English (UK) Version
2005	MediEvil: Resurrection	Dirk Steadfast, Help Gargoyles, Trapped Villager (voices)	
2005	Battalion Wars	Kommandant Ubel	
2005	Conspiracy: Weapons of Mass Destruction		
2006	Medieval II: Total War		
2007	Dragon Quest Swords: The Masked Queen and the Tower of Mirrors		
2007	Battalion Wars 2	Kommandant Ubel (voice)	
2008	Age of Conan: Hyborian Adventures		
2008	Fable II		
2009	Killzone 2	Additional Helghast Voices (voice)	
2009	BattleForge		
2009	Battlefield Heroes	Royals and Nationals (voices)	
2009	Battlefield 1943	Newscaster	
2009	Risen	Luis, Adan, Dargel	
2010	Final Fantasy XIV	Lolorito	
2010	Fable III		
2011	Stronghold 3		
2013	Puppeteer	Captain Gaff (voice)	
2014	LittleBigPlanet 3	Zom-Zom the Far Out (voice)	
2015	Final Fantasy XIV: Heavensward	Lolorito, Nidhogg (voices)	
2017	Final Fantasy XIV: Stormblood	Lolorito (voice)	
2018	Forza Horizon 4	Hans Liebold (voice)	
2019	Forza Horizon 4: LEGO Speed Champions	Hans Liebold (voice)	
2020	Sackboy: A Big Adventure	Zom Zom (voice)	
