= Compare the Meerkat =

Advertising campaign for price comparison website comparethemarket.com

- Aleksandr Orlov, an anthropomorphic Russian meerkat featured in the adverts
- Agency: VCCP
- Client: Compare the Market
- Product: Insurance
- Release dates: 5 January 2009 (UK); 1 February 2013 (Australia) – present

Compare the Meerkat is an advertising campaign on British and Australian commercial television for Compare the Market, a price comparison website, part of the BGL Group. The adverts feature Aleksandr Orlov, an animated anthropomorphic Russian meerkat (voiced by Simon Greenall), and his family and friends. Orlov is portrayed as being of aristocratic stock and the founder of "comparethemeerkat.com": the campaign originally centred on his frustration over the confusion between his website and comparethemarket.com, playing on the similarity between the words market and meerkat. Orlov's catchphrase is "simples".

The campaign, launched on 5 January 2009, was created by advertising agency VCCP. The adverts proved popular and became a commercial success for comparethemarket.com, which became the fourth most visited insurance website in the UK as a result. A book featuring Orlov titled A Simples Life was published in 2010 and other merchandise was created in tandem with the campaign.

== Campaign ==
The campaign, designed by ad-agency VCCP, was launched on 5 January 2009 involving a TV spot, companion website and social media links. The first advert featured Aleksandr Orlov, an animated anthropomorphic Russian meerkat, who complains at the confusion between his site, comparethemeerkat.com, and comparethemarket.com. The character explains that he has launched a TV advertising campaign to make visitors aware of the difference. The companion website, comparethemeerkat.com, was created alongside the TV advert and in 2010 was receiving more than 2 million hits per month. The TV spots and the characters are directed by Darren Walsh, who has also won several awards for the work. In the adverts, Orlov is voiced by Simon Greenall.

The campaign was launched on Australian television on 1 February 2013.

=== Further campaigns ===
In 2010, the campaign expanded with the "Orlov Family Trilogy", which explored Aleksandr Orlov's origins. A book called "A Simples Life" was released alongside the campaign.

Oleg, a baby meerkat adopted by Aleksandr and Sergei, was introduced in a 2013 advert.

Between February and April 2015, Classic Oleg Toy was shown during sponsorships and advertisements.

On 3 April 2015, comparethemarket.com launched a service named "Meerkat Movies", which offered customers cinema tickets when choosing the website. A tie-in ad campaign was launched, with the meerkats seeing contemporary movies such as Terminator Genisys and Ant-Man, which they used Meerkat Movies for. Another ad saw Aleksandr and Sergei go on holiday to Hollywood, whe In May 2018, Aleksandr and Sergei performed a rendition of Barbra Streisand's song "Don't Rain on My Parade" (from the film Funny Girl) to promote the Meerkat Movies campaign.

In 2019, the "Endless Adventures" campaign featured the meerkats entering cinema doors and appearing in films.

In December 2019, a new ad campaign was launched featuring a robotic version of Sergei named "Auto-Sergei", which was designed to help people switch to a better insurance deal, along with providing credit card eligibility checks.

In 2021, a campaign introducing the French meerkat Antoine D'Orleau accompanied the launch of a neighbourhood bills calculator.

In December 2022, a new ad campaign was launched, which introduced a wombat named "Carl", Aleksandr’s nephew. The first ad in a series showed Aleksandr and Sergei at an airport to collect him, who has flown from Australia. Alongside the new campaign, a new slogan, "Don't wombat it, meerkat it", was launched.

In 2024, celebrity chef and television presenter Paul Hollywood starred in two adverts for comparethemarket, the first, which premiered in July, seeing him attempt to film a movie, and the second, which premiered in December, seeing him make a cake version of himself in front of Aleksandr and Sergei.

In January 2025, the company debuted a new ad campaign in Australia, which saw Australian television presenter David Koch make an appearance.

=== Other promotion ===
In November 2012, Compare the Market began sponsoring the ITV1's long-running soap opera Coronation Street as part of a three-year deal with producers of the series. On 30 November 2020, Compare the Meerkat stopped sponsoring Coronation Street, with Simon Daglish, deputy managing director of ITV, saying that "Comparethemarket.com and Corrie has been one of the UK's longest-running and most successful partnerships and I would personally like to say a huge thank you to all at Compare the Market for taking a big idea and turning it into an iconic partnership. But, like all good things it has to come to an end... As we approach the 60th birthday of a British institution we are looking for an ambitious brand to connect with the cultural phenomena that is Coronation Street".

In 2014, Aleksandr and Sergei featured on the Neighbourhood Watch logo to mark the charity's 50th anniversary.

On 3 July 2018, the newly renamed comparethemarket (formerly comparethemarket.com) launched "Meerkat Meals", which offered customers two-for-one meals at selected UK restaurants. The service, which launched in partnership with the Dining Club Group (trading as 'tastecard'), launched on 16 July 2018 and was granted for free to new customers and customers that purchased a qualifying product less than one year ago.

=== Withdrawal of adverts during news broadcasts ===
In February 2022, comparethemarket withdrew adverts from being shown during news broadcasts, following the start of the Russian invasion of Ukraine, stating that it had reviewed its media plan and wanted to avoid the adverts appearing near news on the invasion to ensure that the company was being sensitive to the current situation. However, they still air rarely on news broadcasts, and they still air regularly outside of news broadcasts.

== Characters ==
The adverts are fronted by Aleksandr Orlov, a meerkat oligarch. According to an interview with the character's designer and director, Darren Walsh at Passion Pictures, Orlov became a billionaire sometime in the 1970s. He is described as living in a mansion near the fictitious village of Meerkovo, while owning another large mansion in South London, and spends his time on vanity projects such as his website, numerous self-portraits, petitions and film production.

Sergei, Orlov's IT technician and sidekick, is another prominent character in the campaign. He has appeared in advertisements both with and without Orlov.

The 2011 campaign introduced Meerkovo, a fictional Russian village filmed in Suffolk, England, and several new meerkat characters. The adverts featured new characters complaining about the danger caused to the town by confusion over Comparethemeerkat.com and Comparethemarket.com. The new characters were Maiya , a former spy and a teacher, Yakov, a toy maker, Vassily, a metal musician, and Bogdan, a naughty meerkat child. A companion website was set up for the campaign containing a map of the town. They appeared on Coronation Street bumpers until 2015 when they'd slipped into obscurity though toys were still made. In 2018 they made a return in Coronation Street bumpers.

After this campaign, the adverts began to feature Oleg, a 'meerpup' (a term the meerkats use to refer to a child) who first appeared as an infant in an advert broadcast on 25 December 2013, where Sergei and Aleksandr find him on their doorstep and take him in. On 25 December 2014, whilst on a trip to Africa with Aleksandr and Sergei, Oleg decides to stay behind after befriending the meerkats there. He reappears when he has a dream in 2016. In 2017, he appeared in adverts themed around the films Beauty and the Beast and Star Wars: The Last Jedi. Oleg lived in an African village with another pup named Ayana until their home was destroyed by bulldozers. They hitchhiked across the world looking for Oleg's parents, and finally found them in San Francisco, where they reassumed care of both Oleg and Ayana.

Since the launch of Meerkat Movies, only Aleksandr and Sergei regularly appeared in the main television advertisements, though the Meerkovo characters continued to feature in the Coronation Street sponsorship bumpers after 2018.

In December 2018, Auto Sergei, an animatronic meerkat, was introduced, to make life "simples" and then was upgraded for credit card use. He featured in adverts where Aleksandr acts like a CEO for a big company, while Sergei takes on a similar appearance to Steve Jobs in some adverts.

== Commercial success ==
Following the campaign, comparethemarket.com was ranked as the fourth most visited insurance website in the UK, up from 16th in January 2008, and the site's overall sales doubled. By 2010 the site had increased its market share by 76%, where competitors' share had fallen by up to 30% over the same period. As of August 2009, Aleksandr had more than 700,000 Facebook fans and 22,000 followers on Twitter, while on photo-sharing site Flickr there is a popular gallery of Aleksandr's family. According to entrepreneur David Soskin, the wordplay of "meerkat" vs. "market" overcomes the high cost of the latter keyword in sponsored search engine listings.

In 2013, researchers at the University of Liverpool hypothesised that the mass appeal of the marketing campaign was due to the campaign's successful amalgamation of narrative tropes from Russian literature, comedy literature, and adventure literature.

=== Impact on other marketing campaigns ===
Since the launch the comparethemeerkat campaign, several other companies have adopted marketing campaigns featuring anthropomorphic animal mascots, often citing the campaign's success as inspiration. This includes Thames Water's Otis The Otter and First Direct's Skint Skunk. The comparethemeerkat campaign forced rival GoCompare to launch its adverts starring opera singer Wynne Evans, in an attempt to recapture market share.

== Criticism ==
On 11 August 2009, an opinion piece in The Guardian newspaper accused the advert series of racism for mocking Eastern European accents. The article received a near universally negative reaction and the Advertising Standards Authority, following a complaint by the author of the article, stated that it had not received any similar complaints, and ultimately decided to take no action.

== Merchandise ==
=== Book ===
Orlov's "autobiography" was released on 28 October 2010, entitled A Simples Life: The Life and Times of Aleksandr Orlov. The book generated more pre-orders than that of other books released at the same time including Tony Blair's memoirs and more than double the pre-orders of autobiographies by Cheryl Cole, David Jason, Russell Brand, Jon Snow, Melanie Chisholm and Dannii Minogue. The book was published by Ebury Publishing.

=== Downloads ===
The British website hosts downloads such as wallpapers, ringtones, text alerts, voicemail messages and some commercial videos. There is also an iPhone application containing background information, a database of English phrases in "meerkat" pronunciation (created from audio clips from the TV adverts), a mongoose "detector", and some videos. The British site previously had these features; but it no longer has them and the app is no longer available. However, there is a Meerkat Movies app to redeem the voucher code.

=== Stuffed toys ===
From 1 July 2011, a stuffed toy representing one of the characters had been given away with each policy sold via the website. In December 2013, a baby meerkat called Oleg was introduced and subsequently released a toy. In December 2014, Oleg was removed from adverts, but despite this the toy was still available up until May 2018.

In addition to the seven main characters, there have been limited releases of the school teacher Maiya in a spy outfit, and baby Oleg in a safari outfit.

In March 2016, To mark the launch of Batman v Superman: Dawn of Justice two new meerkat toys were released featuring Sergei in a Superman outfit and Aleksandr in a Batman outfit. In December 2016, two more toys were released as limited editions featuring Oleg as Olaf and a new character Ayana as Elsa from Disney's Frozen.

To celebrate the 40th anniversary of Star Wars in April 2017, another two new meerkat toys were released featuring Aleksandr in a Luke Skywalker outfit, Sergei in an Obi-Wan Kenobi outfit. From the movie Beauty and the Beast meerkats Oleg as the Beast and Ayana as Belle appeared on the shelves. In the Christmas of 2017 and early 2018, an advert featured Oleg in an BB-8 outfit. All toys were not released again after May 2018, although a toy with Oleg in pyjamas was released in September 2020 based on an advert where Oleg and Ayana won't go to sleep.

== See also ==
- The GEICO gecko, Cockney-accented character in a similar campaign for GEICO insurance in the United States since 1999.
- Monkey, anthropomorphic sock puppet used since 2001 in British advertising for ITV Digital and PG Tips.

== Bibliography ==
- Soskin, David (1 November 2010). Net Profit: How to Succeed in Digital Business. John Wiley & Sons. ISBN 978-0-470-66081-2.
