= Iain Robertson =

Scottish actor

- Born: 27 May 1981 (age 45); Glasgow, Scotland
- Other name: Donald Iain Robertson
- Occupation: Actor
- Years active: 1995–2026
- Known for: Small Faces, Grange Hill, Rab C. Nesbitt, River City
- Spouse: Judith Milne (m. 2006; div. 2009)
- Awards: BAFTA, Ian Charleson Award, twice nominee.

Iain Robertson (born 27 May 1981) is a Scottish former actor. He appeared in the films Small Faces (1996) and The Debt Collector (1999), as well as the television series Grange Hill, Rab C. Nesbitt and Band of Brothers.

In July 2026, Robertson was convicted of multiple offences, receiving a nine-year prison sentence.

== Early life ==
Iain Robertson grew up in a family of seven in a tenement in Govan, Glasgow. He held no thoughts of becoming an actor until a primary school teacher pointed out his potential for drama. Robertson has said, "growing up in Govan put fire in my belly, made me push harder and also appreciate the things that have come my way."

At the age of 11, Robertson joined a local dramatic arts group. He set about producing his own play, co-written and directed by his friends. At 12, he won a scholarship to the Sylvia Young Theatre School in London.

Robertson then appeared in British dramas Kavanagh Q.C., Silent Witness, and Bramwell. In 1995, Gillies Mackinnon cast him as the lead in the feature film Small Faces.

== Career ==
Robertson portrayed Craig Stevenson in the paranormal drama series Sea of Souls. He appeared in the sequel Basic Instinct 2 (2006), alongside American actress Sharon Stone. During a prolific period, he took parts in the thriller The Contractor (2007) with Wesley Snipes and joined the cast of Rab C. Nesbitt returning to the streets of his youth.

In 2011, Robertson starred with Simon Callow and Harry Enfield in the feature-length film Acts of Godfrey, a British comedy written entirely in verse.

Robertson appeared as Spanky in a revival of John Byrne's Slab Boys trilogy, and as Romeo in Romeo and Juliet at the Citizens' Theatre. In 2009, he performed at the Lyceum Theatre in Edinburgh, in a theatre adaptation of James Hogg's "Confessions of a Justified Sinner".

During the 2010 Edinburgh Fringe Festival, Robertson performed in D.C. Jackson's My Romantic History at the Traverse Theatre.

Robertson also starred in a one-man show Angels by Ronan O'Donnell at the "Play, a Pie and a Pint" event in Glasgow. This performance received acclaim from critics, noting his exceptional performance.

In 2011, Robertson appeared in a revival of The Hard Man, a play about the Scottish criminal Jimmy Boyle.

Robertson starred with Dawn Steele on Sea of Souls, they had previously appeared together in The Slab Boys. He worked with co-star Bill Paterson on the feature film The Match.

From 2017 until 2023, Robertson played the role of Stevie O'Hara in River City, replacing Cas Harkins, who had played the role from 2003 to 2005.

== Personal life ==
Robertson married Judith Milne in 2006. They divorced in 2009.

In 2004, Robertson was accused of assaulting a photographer in Stirling, but was acquitted.

== Sexual assault allegations and convictions ==
In 2025, Robertson was charged with offences against four women, including the rape of one. He was convicted in June 2026 of raping a woman and assaulting two others. In July 2026, he was sentenced to nine years in jail.

== Filmography ==
- River City (2017–2023) (TV series)
- Whisky Galore (2015)
- Pale Star (2015)
- Holby City (2014–2017) (TV series)
- Acts of Godfrey (2011)
- Rab C. Nesbitt (2008) (TV series)
- Deep Soul (Greek movie), 2009
- Next Time Ned (2009)
- The Contractor (2007)
- Basic Instinct 2 (2006)
- Casualty (2005) (TV series)
- Sea of Souls (2004) (TV series)
- One Last Chance (2004)
- Gunpowder, Treason & Plot (2003) (TV series)
- Taggart (2002) (TV series)
- Band of Brothers (2001) (miniseries)
- Watchmen (2009)
- Hereafter (2000) (TV series)
- Fat Chance (2000)
- Homesick (2000)
- Oliver Twist (1999) (miniseries)
- Rebus (1999) (TV series)
- The Match (1999)
- Poached (1998)
- Grange Hill (1998)
- Plunkett & Macleane (1998)
- The Debt Collector (1998)
- Bramwell (1998) (TV series)
- Psychos (1998) (TV series)
- Trail By Jury (1997) (TV series)
- The Bill (1997) (TV series)
- Silent Witness (1997) (TV series)
- A Mugs Game (1996) (TV series)
- Bodyguards (1996) (TV series)
- Small Faces (1996)
- Kavanagh QC (1995) (TV series)

== Selected theatre credits ==
- The Mysteries (1999) (Royal National Theatre)
- The Good Hope (2000) (Royal National Theatre)
- Romeo & Juliet (2006) (Citizens Theatre)
- Blood Wedding (2006) (Citizens Theatre)
- The Slab Boys Trilogy (2003) (Traverse Theatre)
- The Winters Tale (2000) (Royal National Theatre)
- The Tempest (2002) (Old Vic/Sheffield Crucible)
- Passing Places (2001) (Greenwich Theatre)
- Small Craft Warnings (2008) (Arcola Theatre)
- Confessions of a Justified Sinner (2009) (Royal Lyceum Theatre)

== Selected radio credits ==
- McLevy: The Blue Gown (2011)
- An Audience with Ed Reardon (2010)
- The Sensitive (2010)
- My Blue Hen (2009)
- The Astronaut (2009)
- Tough Love (2008)
- Jimmy Murphy Makes Amends (2008)
- Rebus - Black & Blue (2008)
- Saturday, Sunday, Monday (2007)
- The Tenderness of Wolves (2007)
- Faust (2006)
- The Best Snow for Skiing (2005)
- Japanese Tales (2004)
- Soft Fall the Sounds of Eden (2004)
- Just Prose (2003)
- The Nativity (2003)
- The Passion (2003)
- The Prisoner of Papa Stour (1996)

== Awards ==
- BAFTA (1996, for Small Faces)
- Ian Charleson Commendation (1999, for The Mysteries)
- Ian Charleson Award 3rd Prize (2002, for The Tempest)
- BAFTA (2005, for Sea of Souls)
- Edinburgh Fringe First (2010, for My Romantic History)
