= On the Blog =

BBC radio comedy series

- Genre: Radio comedy
- Country of origin: United Kingdom
- Language: English
- Home station: BBC Radio 2
- Starring: Caroline Quentin; Simon Greenall; Andy Taylor
- Written by: Kris Dyer; Dave Marks; Andy Taylor
- Original release: 3 May 2007

On the Blog is a BBC Radio drama series written and directed by Kris Dyer. Broadcast on BBC Radio 2, it stars Caroline Quentin (Men Behaving Badly), Simon Greenall (I'm Alan Partridge) and Andy Taylor (Red Dwarf). It is co-written by Dave Marks and Andy Taylor and is an Above The Title Production for BBC Radio 2.

== Series One (2007) ==
It was first broadcast on BBC Radio 2 in the summer of 2007. It was also featured on BBC Radio 4's Pick of the Week programme.

"Original and twisted - the don't-miss comedy appointment of the week" Radio Times
"That rare thing - a funny new radio sitcom" Guardian
"The funniest sitcom since Ed Reardon's Week" Sunday Times

Show Title	Show Description	TX Date
1/1. You Can't Hurry Love	When military war-gaming blogger Andrew Glasgow seeks true love online, he ends up with a few rather nasty surprises...	03.05.07
1/2. The First Casualty of War	Andrew Glasgow fights to clear his name after a series of controversial rumours about him are posted online.	10.05.07
1/3. An Englishman's Home	Andrew's mother puts the house on the market, but Andrew does his best to put off the prospective buyers.	17.05.07
1/4. Incest to Infamy	War-gaming blogger Andrew Glasgow does some online research into his family history and is reunited with an old school flame.	24.05.07
1/5. Into the Valley of Debt	Andrew faces a frantic battle to earn some money after mistakenly ordering a full size Napoleonic-era cannon piece from the website E-buy.	31.05.07
1/6. The Long March Home	Seasonal transport chaos leaves blogger Andrew Glasgow stuck on a train with only his laptop and the great British public for company.	07.06.07

- Series One starred Caroline Quentin, Simon Greenall and Andy Taylor. The scripts were by Kris Dyer and Dave Marks with Andy Taylor and John Langdon. It was produced and directed by Dirk Maggs and was an Above the Title Production for BBC Radio 2.
- Series One was repeated on BBC Radio 2 on Thursday nights at 10.30 pm from 16 April to 21 May 2009.

== Series Two (2008) ==
- First broadcast in the summer of 2008 on BBC Radio 2. It was also featured on BBC Radio 4's Pick of the Week programme.

"A very funny sitcom" Sunday Times
"A laugh-out-loud delight" Radio Times

Show Title	Show Description	TX Date
2/1. Virgins & Philistines	A chance online encounter leads Andrew to the bright lights of London in search of true love and cagoules...	31.05.08
2/2. Operation Chastise	Andrew's blossoming love-life is thrown into turmoil by a perilous mission over Nazi Germany's industrial heartland...	07.06.08
2/3. Love & Grenades	The Glasgow's holiday in Bosnia and Milena's romantic pursuit of a mysterious stranger jeopardises the region's fragile peace...	14.06.08
2/4. A Darned Close Run Thing	Milena is hospitalised after a violent allergic reaction and Andrew's obsessive laptop use at her bedside causes I.T. chaos...	21.06.08
2/5. Del Du Jour	Andrew's attempt to undermine the latest media blogging sensation by uncovering their true identity ends in red cheeks all round...	28.06.08
2/6. It's a P.C. World	Andrew finds himself at the centre of a media storm after an apparently incriminating file is found on his computer...	05.07.08

- Episode 6 was pulled from transmission by the BBC.
- Series Two starred Caroline Quentin, Simon Greenall, DeNica Fairman, Israel Oyelumade, Poppy Taylor-Jones, Kris Dyer, Dave Marks and Andy Taylor as Andrew Glasgow. The scripts were by Kris Dyer, Dave Marks and Andy Taylor. The producer was David Morley. The director was Dirk Maggs. It was an Above the Title production for BBC Radio 2.
- Series Two was repeated on BBC Radio 2 on Saturday nights at 10.30pm from 12 June 2010.

== Series Three (2010) ==
- First broadcast in January and February 2010 on BBC Radio 2.

"Cult comedy at its most under-appreciated" The Times
"One of my favourite radio comedies" Radio Times

Show Title	Show Description	TX Date
3/1. Council of War	Andrew's job at the local council is threatened by his mother's desperate attempts to get him to move back home...	14.01.10
3/2. The Root of all Evil	When Andrew lands a job at Hampshire Mutual he has little idea of the impact he's about to make on the local economy...	21.01.10
3/3. Tragical History Tour	Andrew's attempts to save an historical bus tour operator from going under have extraordinary consequences when he decides to go off-piste...	28.01.10
3/4. Missionary Impossible	When Andrew embarks on some training in preparation for his missionary work in Africa he has little idea of the horrors in store for him...	04.02.10
3/5. Out Foxed	Unemployed and destitute Andrew finds himself alienated from his flatmates and sharing his bedroom with a mysterious stranger...	11.02.10
3/6. Cuckoo in the Nest	Andrew finally decides to admit defeat and move back in with his mother but there's a rather nasty surprise waiting for him...	18.02.10

- Series Three starred Caroline Quentin, Simon Greenall, DeNica Fairman, Kris Dyer, Dave Marks and Andy Taylor as Andrew Glasgow. The scripts were by Kris Dyer, Dave Marks and Andy Taylor. The producer was Adam Bromley. It was an Above the Title production for BBC Radio 2.
- Series Three was repeated on BBC Radio 2 on Saturday nights at 10.30pm from 15 January - 19 February 2011.
