= Comedy verite =

Contemporary sitcom form

Comedy verite or Comedy vérité is a television format that presents fictional comedy series in the staged form of a docusoap. This is a technical term from the field of television studies, introduced in order to be able to make more precise distinctions and differentiations between evening-filling mockumentary-films and 'mockumentary series' with an average episode length of 30 minutes. While mockumentary films play with the idea that what is shown could be true, mockumentary-series or comedy verite leave no doubt about their own fictionality.

== Stylistic features ==
Humorous situations and characters are presented as if they were spontaneous and real observations of everyday life at first sight. This means that there is usually a high use of emphasized hand-held camera, emphasized because the recordings are interspersed with Pannings, Whip zooms and 'tracked' Autofocus, as well as occasional covert filming. These alternate with interview-scenes in the style of Talking Heads, as we know them from Television's pundits.

This way Comedy Verite refers to a series with episodes of up to half an hour in length that combines to the specifications of a classic Sitcom in terms of narration and character constellation, but on a formal level gives the impression that it is a Docusoap. In Comedy verite, the clichés and stereotypes of classic Sitcoms are parodied. The television scholar John T. Caldwell also judged this as follows: "[Th]is 'sitcom' is shot like a 'documentary that critiques 'reality television'"

== Word origin (etymology) ==
The term Comedy Verite is a compound word of comedy and vérité (French for "truth") to emphasize the fusion of Situation comedy with Cinema vérité. Cinema vérité stands for a French documentary style of the 1950s and 60s in which the filmmaker constantly intervenes in the filming process and thus stands for stylized productions, interactions between filmmaker and subject, and even moments of deliberate provocation. Television scholar Brett Mills coined this term in 2004 based on an analysis of the series The Office.

== Examples ==
In addition to The Office other well-known examples of this include series such as Arrested Development, Modern Family, Parks and Recreation, Scot Squad, The Comeback, What We Do in the Shadows, Abbott Elementary, Hard Cell, St. Denis Medical and The Paper (2025 TV series).
