= Kay Stonham =

British actress, writer and academic

Kay Stonham is a British actress, writer and academic.

== Background ==
Stonham attended William Morris Senior High School in Walthamstow, East London, leaving in 1974. She then graduated from Rose Bruford College in 1977. Stonham has a master's degree in Screenwriting for Film and Television from Royal Holloway, University of London. She co-created and co-wrote series one and two of the BBC Radio 4 series Robin and Wendy's Wet Weekends, and was sole writer on series three and four. She took the part of Wendy Mayfield opposite collaborator on the first two series Simon Greenall as Robin Mayfield.

== Career ==
She created the mockumentary series Audio Diaries for Radio 4, which ran for three series from 1998 to 2001. As a performer she appeared in the mockumentary series People Like Us, both in its Radio 4 and BBC Two incarnations. She was also a contributor to other Radio 4 comedy shows including The Sunday Format, Dead Ringers and Week Ending. She won the Radio Light Entertainment Titheridge Award in 1995.

In 1995 she shared a Writers' Guild of Great Britain award with her co-writers for the television comedy series Harry Enfield & Chums. Simon Greenall shared the same award. Other TV sketch shows she has written for include Alistair McGowan's Big Impression for BBC One, and Alas Smith and Jones for BBC 2, The Sketch Show for ITV, Comedy Nation for BBC 2 and TV to Go for BBC 1. She was a table writer on My Family in 2006.

Her work for children's and young people's TV includes Kerching! and Dani's House for CBBC, Girls in Love for Granada Kids, Grange Hill for Mersey Television and Shaun the Sheep for Aardman Animations.

== Teaching ==
She was a Teaching Fellow in Screenwriting at the University of Worcester between 2011 and 2013. She also taught screenwriting at the London Film Academy.
