= Sea of Souls =

Television series

- DVD cover
- Genre: Paranormal; Mystery
- Created by: David Kane
- Written by: David Kane; Ed Whitmore
- Starring: Bill Paterson; Archie Panjabi; Peter McDonald; Dawn Steele; Iain Robertson
- Composer: Sheridan Tongue
- Original language: English
- No. of series: 4
- No. of episodes: 20 (list of episodes)

Production
- Executive producer: Barbara McKissack
- Producers: Phil Collinson; Stephen Garwood
- Production locations: Glasgow, Scotland
- Running time: 60 mins.
- Production companies: BBC Scotland; Carnival Films; Sony Pictures Television International

Original release
- Network: BBC One
- Release: 2 February 2004 – 19 April 2007

Sea of Souls is a BBC paranormal drama series, recounting the fictional activities of a group of investigators into psychic and other paranormal events. Produced in-house by BBC Scotland and for the final season by Carnival Films, initially in association with Sony Pictures Television International, the series debuted on BBC One in the UK in February 2004. A second series was shown from January 2005, with a third following in 2006 and then a fourth in April 2007.

The programme was created by writer David Kane, who also wrote the entire first series. The final series, unlike the previous series, was an independent production for BBC Scotland by Carnival Films.

== Overview ==
The central character is Douglas Monaghan, played by Bill Paterson, who is the head of a parapsychology unit at a fictional university in Glasgow, Scotland. In the first series he is assisted by Megan Sharma (Archie Panjabi) and Andrew Gemmill (Peter McDonald), but these characters were replaced – without any on-screen explanation – in the second series by Justine McManus (Dawn Steele) and Craig Stevenson (Iain Robertson).

The series has seen the team encounter phenomena such as ghosts, reincarnation and voodooism. Each series has consisted of six one-hour episodes, initially comprising three two-part story lines. The first series was shown on consecutive Monday and Tuesday nights, but for series two the transmission days switched to Saturday and Sunday. Other changes introduced in the second series included the introduction of sub-plots to help with the pacing of each storyline, and more Scottish-focused story lines, the first series having been criticised for the characters' frequent trips to London.

The third series was broadcast from 7 January – 11 February 2006, each episode airing in a 9.10pm-10.10pm slot. For this third run the format had been changed with the series now consisting of six individual one-episode stories instead of three two-parters, with the episodes being shown once per week on Saturday nights. Executive producer and BBC Scotland Head of Drama Barbara McKissack explained the change in format as being "a much better, faster paced format for this kind of show."

Prominent guest stars in individual story lines have included Peter Capaldi, Siobhan Redmond, James Fleet, John Guerrasio, Paul McGann, John Hannah, Jeff Rawle and Colin Salmon. The first two series have been released on DVD in the UK. The programme has also been shown overseas, including in Australia on the Australian Broadcasting Corporation, which showed the first series from September 2005, with series two being shown on Sci Fi in January 2007. It has also been broadcast to South America by HBO Latin America in 2006. The series has been sold to over forty countries as of December 2005.

== Production ==
The first series was produced by Phil Collinson, but after he left to produce the revival of Doctor Who, Stephen Garwood took over as producer for the second and third series.

== Awards ==
At the BAFTA Scotland Awards, held on 13 November 2005 at the Radisson SAS Hotel, Sea of Souls Series 2 won an award for Best Drama, beating Taggart and Monarch of the Glen.

== Cast ==
Douglas Monaghan – Bill Paterson
Is the main character over all and has featured in all series so far, though he featured much more predominantly in series one and two. He is dependable and compassionate, and has changed throughout the run of the series. At the beginning Douglas was a sceptic, almost refusing to believe and denying anything paranormal. But as of series three he has become more open to the suggestion that not everything can be easily explained by science.

Justine McManus – Dawn Steele
After arriving in series two she struggled to gain the respect of co-workers, but one year on is much more self-assured and is enjoying her new-found friendship with Craig. She is a single mother of her 10-year-old son Billy. We have not been introduced to his father, yet he does often look after Billy. She is empathic and considerate and has a knack with people. Right from the beginning it is clear that Justine has several paranormal abilities, she can apparently see the future (which featured in series three episode Oracle), sense things and see the dead. But none of these have been properly looked into as Justine is unsure of finding out the true nature of them. In series three her abilities are shown to be much more powerful than she could ever have imagined, especially when it seems she has passed them on to her son Billy.

Craig Stevenson – Iain Robertson
Also arrived in series two, Craig is often insensitive and arrogant towards people who seek the department's help, it's clear he's not a people person and he is quick to rush into things. In series three, a new friendship with Justine seems to have done him good. He also loses some of his know-it-all side. Craig's new friendship with Justine also leads to him discover her hidden psychic skills, and it's a revelation that has far-reaching implications for him. In the third series his own beliefs are put to the test, causing him to reconsider his mindset towards the paranormal.

== Locations ==
- The fictional "Clyde University" in the series is in real life Glasgow's University of Strathclyde, whose campus is a principal filming location, particularly during the second and third series.
- The home of the parapsychology department – the "Murray Thompson Building" – is the real-life James Weir Building, the home of the University of Strathclyde's mechanical engineering department, and is used extensively for interior and exterior shots in the series.
- Some scenes were shot in Edinburgh.

== Episode list ==
=== Series 1 (2004) ===
Even though they only appear in this series, Monaghan's two assistants, Megan Sharma and Andrew Gemmil, are not formally written out in the concluding story. Phil Collinson produced this series only, moving immediately thereafter to Doctor Who.

No. overall	No. in series	Title	Directed by	Written by	Original release date	Viewers (millions)
1	1	"Seeing Double (Part 1)"	James Hawes	David Kane	2 February 2004	6.06m
Douglas Monaghan and his two assistants investigate the case of Carol Fleming, a personal friend of Monaghan's, who sees her double, Helen Reid, at a local museum. The women chat over coffee and learn that they share the same taste in art and are both married to men named Gordon. When they realize that they are the same age and have the same birth date, they realize they must be twins. Monaghan is interested in Carol's dreams where she sees herself and twin girls watching a doll's house burning, and he invites Carol and Helen to come to the lab.
2	2	"Seeing Double (Part 2)"	James Hawes	David Kane	3 February 2004	N/A
Helen can't understand why Carol would put her ideal home situation in jeopardy by having an affair with Mike and even impersonates her sister to break off the relationship. She's also studying the intricate details of Carol's childhood. When her boyfriend Mike is murdered, Carol has feelings of guilt and Monaghan isn't sure if she might be unstable. As Monaghan's assistants look into Helen's background and childhood, they begin to realize that she is the one who may be seriously disturbed. It becomes obvious that one is setting the other up for Mike's murder.
3	3	"Mind Over Matter (Part 1)"	Nick Willing	David Kane	9 February 2004	N/A
Monaghan and his assistants investigate paranormal phenomena, specifically the transference of souls from the dead to the living or, more simply, reincarnation. After an unsuccessful trip to Lebanon where a young boy apparently had detailed memories of another life, they're faced with the case of 6-year-old Joe Quinn who starts to have memories of another life belonging to someone named George: a home by a lake; that his "other mummy" had red hair; and of a drowning. Is he however remembering a past life?
4	4	"Mind Over Matter (Part 2)"	Nick Willing	David Kane	10 February 2004	5.90m
Having concluded that the George young Joe has been referring to is in fact Georgina McKay who disappeared six years ago, the investigators tell the missing girl's mother about their reincarnation theory. This doesn't sit well with the woman who clings to the hope that her daughter is still alive. As Joe begins to recall more about Georgina's life, the information begins to point to her father as her possible murderer. The police re-open the investigation into the girl's disappearance when they find her body in the loch - exactly where Joe told them to look.
5	5	"That Old Black Magic (Part 1)"	Richard Laxton	David Kane	16 February 2004	4.81m
Yemi is a student who also has to deal with the fact that her father is seriously ill in hospital. Along with her brother Lucas, she spends much of her free time sitting by their father's bedside but the doctors have told them to prepare for the worst. Her brother Lucas says he may seek the assistance of someone who know about traditional healers but Yemi dismisses the idea. When Lucas disappears however, she finds an address among his possessions and goes to an old abandoned house where she finds strange markings on the wall and blood on the floor.
6	6	"That Old Black Magic (Part 2)"	Richard Laxton	David Kane	17 February 2004	4.80m
Yemi returns to London accompanied by William but she starts to see familiar faces following her and runs off. William and Douglas visit a traditional healer for information. He confirms the rumors that some practitioners of muti, a traditional form of healing, may be using human rather than animal parts, but that's all he knows, rumours. Back at the university meanwhile, Megan starts to receive emails from someone warning them all that they are being watched. Douglas makes a connection to a well-heeled businessman with connections to Africa.

=== Series 2 (2005) ===
No. overall	No. in series	Title	Directed by	Written by	Original release date	Viewers (millions)
7	1	"Amulet (Part 1)"	Brian Kelly	Ed Whitmore	8 January 2005	6.71m
Findley Morrison seeks Monaghan's assistance when strange things happen in his house. All family members, including his wife Carol, son Dominic and daughters Claire and Martha have heard noises, experienced doors opening or closing and perhaps even seen images of someone moving about, though never clearly. Douglas and his assistant Justine McManus spend some time in the house and they too begin to experience some of these strange occurrences. They are also beginning to see the numbers 2976 being repeated.
8	2	"Amulet (Part 2)"	Brian Kelly	Ed Whitmore	9 January 2005	6.24m
Douglas and Justine continue their investigation, even though they were asked to leave the Morrisons house. From the family's reaction, Justine suspects that the strange occurrences may be linked to a Bolivian woman named Lygia who worked as a nanny for the Morrisons some years before, She follows up with Findlay Morrison who says that Lygia returned to Bolivia and has successfully completed law school since. It turns out the Morrisons paid her tuition as well. Douglas still thinks that Claire is the focus of any paranormal activity and decides to test her.
9	3	"Omen (Part 1)"	Maurice Philips	Peter Jukes	15 January 2005	5.80m
Daniel Blakemore seeks out Monaghan but has a strange way of doing it - he steps out in front of Monaghan's moving car. He's not hurt seriously however and soon, Monaghan and his team are fascinated by the close mouthed man who clearly appears to have precognitive abilities, that is, the ability to predict future events. Daniel mentions that he was in the military and when he disappears - Douglas suggested he might be suicidal - he and his assistant Craig Stevenson pay a call on his Regiment.
10	4	"Omen (Part 2)"	Maurice Philips	Peter Jukes	16 January 2005	4.58m
Although Daniel Blakemore has died accidentally, the Army still wants to know what the corporal may have told Professor Monaghan and his team. Monaghan himself feels a certain amount of guilt about Daniel's death and is having trouble sleeping. He even imagines seeing him from time to time on the street or seeing a hooded faceless figure following him. He can't explain what is happening to him. He determines that he's probably being followed and suspects the military of being behind it all.
11	5	"An Empty Promise (Part 1)"	Suri Krishnamma	David Kane	22 February 2005	5.32m
Monaghan welcomes back one of his former students, Peter Locke, now a professor who has made quite a name for himself in North America. Craig Stephenson studies the case of John Wade, a self-styled mentalist who has a successful stage show. Although he amazes his audiences, he is clearly using well-worn techniques to correctly guess information of audience members. There are a few anomalies however. Justine McManus meanwhile travels to a psychiatric hospital to investigate the case of a woman who claims she is the survivor of a shipwreck that occurred in 1904.
12	6	"An Empty Promise (Part 2)"	Suri Krishnamma	David Kane	23 February 2005	5.17m
John Wade is convinced that he can cure young Chloe Williams of her brain tumour. Craig Stephenson is quite skeptical but newly arrived Peter Locke isn't and is quite keen to study the case. As they learn more about John's background and family history, they realize there may be a more than reasonable explanation for his behaviour, though not all can be explained away. Justine McManus goes to Patience Green's home village and finds that it is much as she described it, and discovers that her knowledge of the locality and of the people who lived there is astounding.

=== Series 3 (2006) ===
This series offered a change to the format. Instead of three, two-part mysteries, aired over the course of three weeks, this series offered a more traditional six-week episodic format. As with the first series, however, the student assistants made their final appearances in the concluding story without their departures being explained.

No. overall	No. in series	Title	Directed by	Written by	Original release date	Viewers (millions)
13	1	"Insiders"	Diarmuid Lawrence	Ed Whitmore	7 January 2006	5.58m
The team investigate the apparent possession of a grieving father by a recently murdered criminal.
14	2	"Oracle"	Brian Kelly	Niall Leonard	14 January 2006	5.65m
Justine admits to having precognition abilities and in doing so ends up saving lives.
15	3	"Sleeper"	Brian Kelly	Paul Logue	21 January 2006	5.09m
Roommates Chloe, Josh and Stuart arrange to use the University's facilities for an amateur experiment to see if they can cure Stuart's increasingly common nightmares. Justine arranges to supervise the seemingly innocuous procedure over night. When Stuart starts to dream his nightmares come to life, starting with visions that Justine experiences. Calling in Douglas to help determine what's happening, Stuart's dreams take on more and more menace and the group becomes trapped inside the building while his nightmares run rampant.
16	4	"The Newsroom"	Diarmuid Lawrence	Dusty Hughes	28 January 2006	5.36m
After a former storage area is converted into new suites at a Glasgow hotel, guests and staff begin to experience frightening disturbances. The manager, granddaughter of the original owner, hires the Clyde University parapsychology department to investigate. When Justine and Craig spend a few nights in the "haunted" rooms, they wonder if sibling rivalry between the manager and her brother, or a real haunting, is occurring.
17	5	"Succubus"	Patrick Harkins	Sergio Casci	4 February 2006	5.23m
When a man comes to Craig and Justine for help after a woman tells him is about to die, Craig dismisses him as a kook. But when he visits the man's flat to return a jacket, he discovers the man has died. Curious, Craig visits a web site the man had mentioned and meets an alluring woman. Following clues the dead man left behind, Justine begins to suspect the woman involved may be a demon whose sole purpose is to propagate her kind, and is using Craig for that purpose.
18	6	"Rebound"	Patrick Harkins	Chris Murray	11 February 2006	5.13m
Suddenly dumped and fired by her boyfriend and boss, occult publisher Christopher, Leah takes part in a magickal ritual, invoking a demon in the hope of winning him back. The demon turns against her instead, and Leah starts manifesting powerful and dangerous electrical effects. Douglas and the team are called in to investigate. Some research into arcana, and a climactic ritual, lead Douglas to question his lifelong rationalism.

=== Series 4 (2007) ===
This series features Monaghan without any student assistants. Music for this series was provided by Sheridan Tongue, and was his sole contribution to Sea of Souls.

No. overall	No. in series	Title	Directed by	Written by	Original release date	Viewers (millions)
19	1	"The Prayer Tree (Part 1)"	Andy Hay	David Kane	17 April 2007	5.40m
When a young couple, Karen and Ian O'Rourke, move into an old home they discover unique symbols painted on the walls. When they post the image on the Internet, Monaghan believes they have found the Tree of Life, a symbol of the Order of the Golden Dawn, a 19th century spiritualist group. At the end of the 19th century Robert Dunbar, a spiritualist, occupied the home and he may have decoded a cipher manuscript that was central to the Order. As Monaghan researches the history of the house he learns that it has a macabre history including the previous owner who was found dead at the bottom of the stairs and Dunbar himself who killed his wife and was hanged for it. As Karen begins to see spirits from the past, she desperately wants to leave the house and move on.
20	2	"The Prayer Tree (Part 2)"	Andy Hay	David Kane	19 April 2007	4.39m
As Monaghan continues his research into the house, he finds that there may have been other beliefs at work there and suggests to the O'Rourke's that they leave the house. When they find Rebecca Muir's diary, Monaghan starts to fill the gaps in the history of the house and the Dunbars. What he learns however is that the O'Rourke's may not have acquired the house by chance and that the spirits there have designs on the O'Rourke's themselves.
