= Dot the i =

Dot the I
- Spanish theatrical release poster
- Directed by: Matthew Parkhill
- Written by: Matthew Parkhill
- Produced by: George Duffield; Meg Thomson
- Starring: Gael García Bernal; Natalia Verbeke; James D'Arcy
- Cinematography: Affonso Beato
- Edited by: Jon Harris
- Music by: Javier Navarrete
- Production companies: Alquimia Cinema; Arcane Pictures
- Distributed by: Summit Entertainment (United States); Momentum Pictures (United Kingdom); Hispano Foxfilm (Spain, via 20th Century Fox)
- Release dates: January 18, 2003 (Sundance); October 31, 2003 (Spain); March 11, 2005 (United States)
- Running time: 92 minutes
- Countries: United States; United Kingdom; Spain
- Language: English
- Box office: $306,224

Dot the I (Spanish: el punto sobre la I) is a 2003 psychological thriller film starring Gael García Bernal, Natalia Verbeke, and James D'Arcy. It was written and directed by Matthew Parkhill. It premiered at the 2003 Sundance Film Festival and was later released on October 31 of that year in Spain. In the United States, it was released on March 11, 2005.

== Plot ==
Carmen, a young Spanish woman who is engaged to be married, has her hen night at a French restaurant in London. She is invited to participate in the observance of an old custom which allows her to kiss the stranger of her choice before the marriage, symbolically "kissing her single life goodbye" and bringing luck for the future. The man she chooses is Kit and both enjoy the kiss far more than they have intended. They fall in love, which creates a "love triangle" among Carmen, her fiancé Barnaby, and Kit.

What initially appears to be a typical urban love story begins to take some surprising and dark twists. In the third act, it is revealed that the circumstances have been arranged in order to create an "emotional snuff film". Unbeknownst to Carmen, she has been cast as the female lead in this endeavor. Barnaby has hired Kit to play a part in the deception, but has misled him by neglecting to mention that he himself, the director, will take on the role of Carmen's fiancé (Kit believing that the couple know nothing of the film). Barnaby is apparently unscrupulous, as he actually marries Carmen for the sake of the film and later fakes a violent suicide (his motive being that Carmen will never love him as she does Kit). In a state of shock, she returns to Kit, who is also horrified, guilty, and never having met the husband, still in the dark as to the true identity of a man he knows only as "Ford". He admits to Carmen that he has been paid by a man to seduce her for a film, and that he regrets it immensely.

Barnaby, whom Kit recognizes as his employer, suddenly appears, offering Kit his final pay and removing camera equipment he previously has concealed in the actor's bedsit without his knowledge. With contemptible satisfaction, he unravels his entire plan to the shocked, broken pair and bitterly ridicules them before leaving.

Several months later, as the film is about to open, Barnaby appears to have won Carmen back. For a ceremony during which he is to accept a filmmakers' award, he engineers a publicity stunt by which it appears that Kit will have the ultimate revenge. However, Carmen takes advantage of the opportunity to do in her manipulative husband for real while framing his business partners for murder. Tragedy generates sensation and, while its clueless producers await trial, the film enjoys a big opening at which Carmen and Kit arrive in style, together.

== Cast ==
- Gael García Bernal as Kit Winter, a Brazilian actor living in London, England
- Natalia Verbeke as Carmen Colazzo, a Spaniard who is engaged to Barnaby
- James D'Arcy as Barnaby F. Caspian, an English film director
- Tom Hardy as Tom
- Charlie Cox as Theo
- Myfanwy Waring as Carmen's Friend
- Michael Webber as Landlord
- Yves Aubert as Maitre d'
- Jonathan Kydd as Burger Bar Manager
- Michael Elwyn as Hotel Manager

== Release ==
The film received a very limited release in the United States, grossing only about $300,000.

== Reception ==
On review aggregator website Rotten Tomatoes, Dot the I has an approval rating of 25% based on 57 reviews, with an average rating of 4.6/10. The critics consensus reads: "dot the i starts out as a standard love triangle, but last minute revelations turn the movie into a gimmick."

Wesley Morris of The Boston Globe criticized the film's mélange of different genres, writing that the movie "begins as a romantic comedy, turns into romantic thriller, then collapses into a sick and illogical self-reflexive noir". Roger Ebert was one of the few admirers of the film and awarded it three out of four stars, but wrote the film will prompt "perplexing questions about motives, means, access and techniques."

== See also ==
- Naqaab
- Meta-reference
- List of Spanish films of 2003
