= Douw Steyn =

South African billionaire businessman (1952–2025)

- Born: Douw Gerbrand Steyn; 19 December 1952
- Died: 4 February 2025 (aged 72)
- Education: Potchefstroom University for Christian Higher Education
- Occupation: Businessman
- Known for: Founder of BGL Group
- Spouse: Carolyn Steyn (m.2013)
- Partner: Donne Botha (2005-2009)

Douw Gerbrand Steyn (19 December 1952 – 4 February 2025) was a South African billionaire businessman, the founder of BGL Group, a UK-based insurance and financial services company, and the parent of Compare the Market. Steyn had links to South African politics, having housed former South African president Nelson Mandela at the Saxon Hotel, Villas & Spa.

According to The Sunday Times Rich List in 2021, Steyn had an estimated net worth of £2.05 billion, an increase of £1.1 billion from 2020.

== Early life ==
Douw Gerbrand Steyn was born in December 1952. He went to school in Linden, Johannesburg. He received a bachelor's degree in 1978 from Potchefstroom University for Christian Higher Education.

== Career ==
Steyn began his career as a quantity surveyor at Eskom Mega Watt Park.

Steyn founded BGL Group (which was founded as Budget Insurance Company in 1992), a UK-based insurance and financial services company, and the parent of Compare the Market.

In 2015, Steyn launched the development of a luxury private estate, Steyn City, on a 900-hectare (2,200-acre) site between Fourways and Lanseria in Johannesburg. The project initially drew R6.5 billion in investment, with a further R5.5 billion invested in 2019.

In April 2020, Steyn pledged R320 million to assist the coronavirus relief efforts in South Africa through the Douw Steyn Family Trust and the companies he founded.

== Personal life and death ==
Steyn was in a relationship with Donne Botha from 2005 to 2009; and on the basis of an extravagant ceremony in London in 2007, Botha claimed in 2014 that they were married, and began a legal bid for half of his estate. In August 2021, the Durban High Court ruled that they were never married, and that a punitive cost order against Botha was warranted.

In February 2013, he married Carolyn Steyn at the Saxon Boutique Hotel, where guests included Graça Machel, Timothy Moloi, and Michael de Pinna.

Steyn died on 4 February 2025, at the age of 72.
