= Mark Pearson (entrepreneur) =

Entrepreneur and Investor

- Born: 1980 (age 45–46)

Mark Pearson (born 1980) is a London-based businessman. He founded and was CEO of Markco Media, a European discount network.

In June 2014, Markco Media, the parent company of MyVoucherCodes, was acquired by Monitise plc for £55m.

== Early life and career ==
Pearson grew up on a council estate in Liverpool with his mother and sister.

At age 23, Pearson founded Roses by Design, selling fresh rose petals with custom messages. Through this venture, he discovered affiliate marketing when Interflora and Flowers Direct requested to place discount code banners on his website.

In November 2006, aged 26, Pearson launched MyVoucherCodes with an initial investment of £300. The business operated from his bedroom until 2009, when he established an office in Croydon, later relocating to central London in 2011.

== Investment activities ==
Pearson has invested approximately £5m across nine companies, with minimum investments of £100,000.

His investment portfolio includes Shopwave, an iPad payment system for retailers, and Calq, a mobile analytics firm. He invested £1m in Ve Interactive, which expanded from 30 to 700 employees across 18 global offices. Ve Interactive reached a valuation of $3bn in June 2015 before entering administration in April 2017. A consortium including Pearson subsequently acquired the company for £2m.

In October 2014, Warner Music Group acquired Playlists.net, another of Pearson's investments.

== Fuel ventures ==
In December 2013, Pearson and Paul Rous, a former Goldman Sachs corporate financier, along with Sapphire Capital Partners LLP, established Fuel Ventures, an early-stage e-commerce investment fund and startup studio.

The fund raised £539,900 through crowdfunding platform Seedrs, with tennis player Andy Murray among its investors.

== Community engagement ==
In 2010, Pearson appeared on Channel 4's The Secret Millionaire, donating £115,000 to three Nottingham-based charities addressing gun crime and domestic violence.

In 2012, he established Hackathon London, connecting developers with investors and mentors. He later sponsored the Young Rewired State Hackathon in Scotland when it faced cancellation.

== Recognition ==
- 2010 - Real Business Growing Business Awards "Young Entrepreneur of the Year"
- 2011 - Ernst and Young "Emerging Entrepreneur of the Year"
- 2011 - Smarta "Young Gun"
- 2012 - Digital Entrepreneur Awards "Digital Entrepreneur of the Year"

The Sunday Times Rich List 2011 valued his fortune at £60m.
