= Compare the Market =

UK price comparison website

- Type: Subsidiary
- Industry: E-commerce
- Founded: 2006
- Founders: Matthew Donaldson; Douw Steyn; Peter Winslow
- Headquarters: Peterborough; London; United Kingdom
- Key people: Mark Bailie (CEO)
- Parent: BGL Group
- Website: www.comparethemarket.com

Compare the Market (stylised as comparethemarket) is a UK price comparison website, founded in 2006, that is part of the BGL Group. The website also offers other online companies the ability to provide their customers with a co-branded or white labelled comparison service.

In 2009, the company launched an advertising campaign featuring a series of meerkat characters (tied in with the supposed pronunciation of the word "market" in a Russian accent), after which it became one of the "Big Four" price comparison website in the UK.

== History ==
The website was set up by Budget Group (now BGL Group) in early 2006, following a decision to sell its high street business to Swinton.

In 2012, an Australian division of the company was launched, with its television advertisements also featuring the meerkat characters Aleksandr and Sergei. The ads themselves, however, differ from their British counterparts, with one such storyline revealing the meerkats had purchased the Australian site.

=== Comparison products ===
Comparethemarket allows customers to compare prices on a number of insurance products including car, home, van, life, pet, travel and over 50s insurance. It has also expanded into the comparison of other products that can be switched such as energy/utilities, broadband and digital TV, as well as a range of financial products such as loans, credit cards, current accounts and mortgages.

=== Compare the Meerkat campaign ===
The "Aleksandr Orlov" meerkat character used in the company's advertising since 2009.

On 5 January 2009, the company launched an advertising campaign featuring a CGI meerkat character named "Aleksandr Orlov" who pleads with viewers looking for cheap car insurance to stop confusing his meerkat comparison website comparethemeerkat.com with comparethemarket.com, due to the similarity between the words meerkat and market. As part of the campaign, Comparethemeerkat.com was created which did indeed allow visitors to compare meerkats.

On 26 November 2012, the website started sponsoring the long-running soap opera Coronation Street on ITV in a three-year deal, costing around £30 million.

=== Other adverts ===
In December 2012 another advert was launched this time featuring Maurice Wigglethorpe-Throom (played by Robert Webb) the founder of Compare the Market and his assistant Spencer who find out about Aleksandr (who makes a cameo appearance in a photograph) and Compare the Meerkat.

=== Competition law investigation ===
In September 2017 the Competition and Markets Authority (CMA) opened an investigation into Comparethemarket's use of wide most favoured nation (MFN) clauses in its contracts with home insurance providers, which prevented those insurers from offering lower prices on rival price comparison websites. The CMA issued a statement of objections on 2 November 2018; its chief executive, Andrea Coscelli, said that the authority had "provisionally found that Comparethemarket has broken the law by preventing home insurers from offering lower prices elsewhere".

On 19 November 2020 the CMA found that BGL (Holdings) Limited, BGL Group Limited, BISL Limited and Compare The Market Limited had infringed the Chapter I prohibition of the Competition Act 1998 and Article 101(1) of the Treaty on the Functioning of the European Union between December 2015 and December 2017, and imposed a penalty of £17,910,062.

The companies appealed to the Competition Appeal Tribunal (CAT) in February 2021. On 8 August 2022 the tribunal unanimously allowed the appeal and set aside the decision, and with it the penalty. The CAT held that the CMA's definition of a single two-sided market for home insurance price comparison was "materially wrong", and that the CMA had "failed to establish that wMFNs had the anti-competitive effects articulated in its Decision", much of its analysis being pitched "at the level of theory or bare assertion, with no significant reference to quantitative evidence". Compare the Market said it was "happy with the outcome", while the CMA said it was "disappointed with the judgment" and was considering its next steps. The decision had been the CMA's first infringement finding on wide MFN clauses; legal commentators noted that the judgment came shortly after the Vertical Agreements Block Exemption Order, in force since June 2022, classified wide retail MFN clauses as hardcore restrictions under UK competition law.

== TV show sponsorship ==
TV show	Duration	Notes
Coronation Street	2012–2020	

== See also ==
- MoneySuperMarket
- Confused.com
- Uswitch
- Go.Compare
