= Acts of Godfrey =

British comedy film

- Directed by: Johnny Daukes
- Written by: Johnny Daukes
- Produced by: Julie Clark; Tony Schlesinger
- Starring: Simon Callow; Iain Robertson; Harry Enfield; Myfanwy Waring; Doon Mackichan; Celia Imrie
- Cinematography: Stuart Graham
- Edited by: Gary Dollner
- Music by: Johnny Daukes
- Distributed by: Guerilla Films
- Release date: 27 January 2012 (United Kingdom)
- Running time: 85 minutes
- Country: United Kingdom
- Language: English
- Box office: $5,458

Acts of Godfrey is a 2011 independent comedy film written and directed by Johnny Daukes, starring Simon Callow, Iain Robertson, Myfanwy Waring, and Harry Enfield. It is notable for being written entirely in rhyming couplets.

The film follows God (Callow) as he tries to matchmake sales reps Vic (Robertson) and Mary (Waring) who both harbour opposing attitudes to their jobs, amidst the backdrop of the interconnecting lives of other conference attendees.

It premiered at the Raindance Film Festival in 2011, before being given a limited UK theatrical release on 27th January 2012.

== Plot ==
At the hotel where he is attending a sales conference, Vic Timms arrives late due to car troubles. The following morning the other attendees are introduced by God; Terry and Phil are thuggish drug salesmen, Malcolm works in pensions, Gita for a funeral director, Jamie is a music producer, Jacqui sells Spanish villas, and Mary for whom the ends always justify the means.

In the afternoon session Vic, a conscientious alarm salesman, testifies for selling with a sense of decency, which Mary argues against. Terry and Phil also engage in a role play session with Vic in which they demonstrate their sales pitch for an aphrodisiac called Poke. Malcolm tells the group about how he met Helen, a grieving widow whose details he had illicitly purchased from a funeral home. Over time he gained her trust and entered into a relationship with her with the intention of defrauding her of £400,000, all of which was technically legal.

In the bar that evening God inspires Jacqui to place a bet with Mary over whether they can sleep with Jamie and Vic, respectively. While talking to Vic, Gita describes her upbringing and confesses that she is the one who sells widow's details to Malcolm, using the money to help her family. Malcolm tells Jamie that he is also attending the conference as the hotel is concurrently hosting a Saga holiday, which he hopes to use to meet more prospective victims he can extort. As the drinks flow he also recounts a story about a woman named Maxine, another woman he had stolen from and mother of two boys, one of whom was killed in a car accident when she tried to confront him. Jacqui also tells Mary about one of her previous clients, Billy McGann, who was a violent criminal as well as Terry and Phil's employer. Using this knowledge she asks the men for two doses of Poke, one for her and one for Vic, which she needs to win her bet with Jacqui. Whilst talking it is also revealed that Helen was Billy's mother, and that she killed herself after falling victim to Malcolm. That night Vic seems upset he still has not had any messages, and has nightmares which this time include events from the conference.

The next morning Jacqui and Jamie speak to the Hotel's receptionist who answers their question with information which reveals that they spent the previous night together. He also assures Vic that no messages have been left. At the conference Gita confesses her employers' pressure tactics to the group, as well as her association with Malcolm. Jamie also confronts Malcolm when he explains that he is the son of Maxine and brother of the boy who was killed. He had also recorded Malcolm's earlier recounting of what had happened, and having informed the police they enter and arrest him. Whilst there Gita confesses her role in Malcolm's crimes, and they also recognise Terry and Phil who they wish to question regarding their association with Billy. As he is being taken away in handcuffs Malcolm is also confronted by three women from the Saga holiday, all of whom he has begun to ingratiate himself with under a different name.

In the restaurant that night Jamie and Jacqui leave early, and Mary spikes both her and Vic's drink with Poke. They soon sleep together, but the following morning an apologetic Vic leaves before Mary wakes up. In the lobby of the hotel he is confronted by his wife, Sheila, who had been unable to contact him due to the receptionist mistakenly believing he was staying in a different room, and thus not passing on her messages. Unable to follow her after she drives off, Vic confides to God that he never really loved her, to which God replies that it doesn't matter as Mary has just conceived their child and that he will have a brighter future with her instead.

In a mid credit sequence Vic receives a telephone call from Malcolm who informs him that he is his biological father, and asks for bail money.

== Cast ==
- Simon Callow as Godfrey
- Iain Robertson as Victor
- Harry Enfield as Malcolm
- Myfanwy Waring as Mary
- Doon Mackichan as Jacqui
- Michael Wildman as Jamie
- Ian Burfield as Terry
- Jay Simpson as Phil
- Shobu Kapoor as Gita
- Celia Imrie as Helen

== Reception ==
The film has an 8% approval rating on the review aggregator Rotten Tomatoes, based on 13 reviews.

Writing for Time Out, Edward Lawrenson formatted his review in rhyming couplets, saying;

"Set among delegates at a sales convention,
This predictable farce runs low on tension.
But the style is playful, the humour biting,
As the film charts the effect of so much in-fighting"

and concluding that,

"The results are slight but old-fashioned fun,
Think less TS Eliot, more ‘Carry On’".

Mark Kermode likewise made the same comparison in The Guardian, stating that the film "deserves plaudits for taking a running jump at the kind of insurmountable "obstacle" that would have doubtless delighted Lars von Trier", but "the puppets-of-fate narrative never quite takes flight, descending rather too often into pantomime pastiche and broader-than-broad Carry On oompah."

== Honours ==
Acts of Godfrey was nominated for the Raindance Award at the 14th annual British Independent Film Awards, held in 2011.

== Home Media ==
Acts of Godfrey was released on DVD by Guerilla Films in April 2012.

== See also ==
- Portrayals of God in popular media
