= Audio Diaries =

British radio programme

Audio Diaries was a short-lived radio programme that aired from 1998 to 2001. There were 15 half-hour episodes and it was broadcast on BBC Radio 4. It was written by Kay Stonham and produced by Jane Berthoud.

== Notes and references ==
Lavalie, John. Audio Diaries. EpGuides. 21 Jul 2005. 29 Jul 2005 <https://web.archive.org/web/20090421053520/http://epguides.com/AudioDiaries/%3E.
