= London Film Academy =

Film school in Fulham, London

Coordinates: 51.4819°N 0.1983°W

- Other names: LFA
- Motto: Think Film. Live Film. Breathe Film
- Type: Private film school
- Established: 2001
- Founders: Anna MacDonald and Daisy Gili
- Location: London, United Kingdom
- Colors: Black, White, Yellow
- Website: www.londonfilmacademy.com

The London Film Academy (LFA) is a UK film school situated in Fulham, London. Founded in 2001, the LFA offers undergraduate, postgraduate and short courses, providing practical training across all key filmmaking disciplines.

== History ==
Based within a converted Methodist Church on Walham Grove, the London Film Academy was founded in 2001. The stated ethos was to produce practical film courses that focused on the art of celluloid filmmaking, with lecturers that were active within the film industry.

In January 2006 the LFA formed a partnership with Club Panico. Panico was created in the mid eighties and has patrons that include Terry Gilliam, Terry Jones and Sir Ben Kingsley.

The LFA holds its annual graduation show at the BFI Southbank. Daisy Gili and Anna MacDonald co-founded the Academy and have served as joint principals of the LFA for fifteen years, and remain so as at 2019.

The London Film Academy announced a scholarship for emerging female filmmakers, worth £23,000, in September 2017.

== Accreditation ==
The London Film Academy was reviewed by the QAA (Quality Assurance Agency for Higher Education) in November 2012, and November 2016. The result, in both instances, was a positive affirmation of LFA standards.

== Tutors ==
Amongst the academy's tutors are cinematographer Andrew Speller, director David Pope, and screenwriter Kay Stonham.

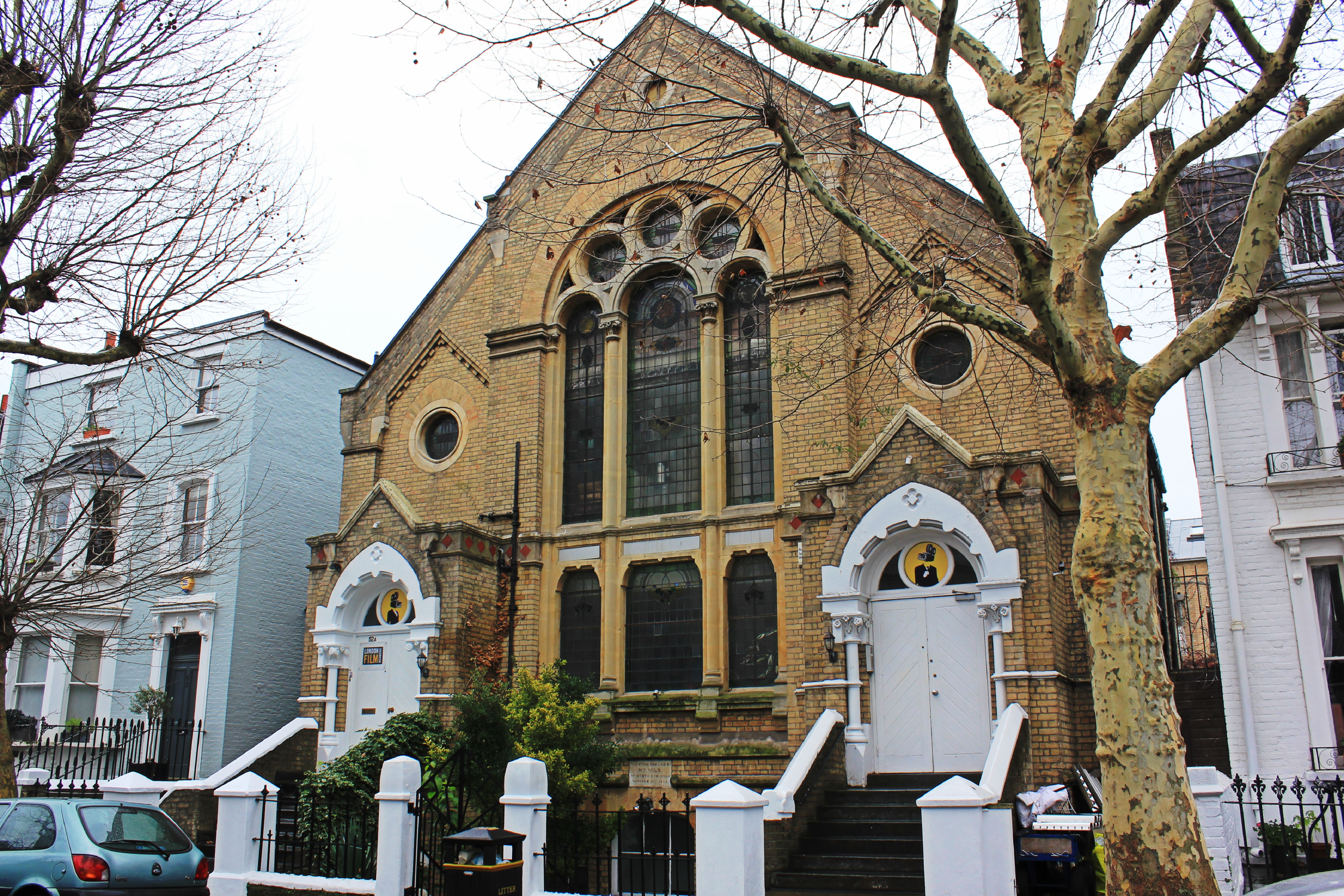
London Film Academy, Fulham, London

== Partners ==
The academy's partners include: British Film Institute (BFI), Arri, University of Derby and Anglia Ruskin University (Cambridge Campus).

== Courses of study ==
The academy teaches a variety of courses from a 2-year BA Filmmaking to 1-Day Short courses.
