= Confused.com =

British financial services platform

- Type: Limited company
- Industry: Financial services
- Founded: 2001; 25 years ago
- Headquarters: Cardiff, Wales, UK
- Area served: United Kingdom
- Key people: Steve Dukes (CEO)
- Services: Financial services
- Parent: RVU
- Website: https://www.confused.com

Confused.com is a UK-based financial services comparison platform launched in 2001 and specialising in comparison of insurance and financial services, including car insurance, home insurance, energy, van insurance and life insurance. Confused.com's platform includes a website and app.

== History ==
Confused.com launched in 2001, becoming the UK's first car insurance comparison site. Its offices are based in Cardiff, Wales.

Confused.com was part of the Admiral Group plc until its sale to RVU on 30 May 2021.

Confused.com is regulated by the Financial Conduct Authority.

== Management ==
Confused.com has undergone a high degree of management churn in recent years. At the top level, founding Managing Director Kate Armstrong, an IT consultant originally from Sydney, retired from the business in 2005, following the successful flotation of the Admiral Group. She was succeeded by Deborah Williams who took the reins from 2005 to 2007. The business underwent expansive growth in this period with profit hitting £36 million in 2007. It was with some degree of surprise therefore that the industry received news of Williams' departure to join a relatively unknown insurance broker. Williams was succeeded by Carlton Hood in the newly created position of CEO. The sector was shaken up by the ground breaking Compare the Market campaign in 2009; Confused.com, along with other established competitors, lost market share. Hood resigned abruptly in 2010 and was succeeded by Group FD Kevin Chidwick as an interim measure.

Chidwick remained in place until January 2012, and was succeeded by Admiral Group senior manager Nic Weng Kan followed by Martin Coriat. Coriat was MD of Admiral-owned French comparison site LeLynx.fr until he took up the position of Confused.com CEO in October 2013.

In August 2012, Joby Russell stepped into the role of Marketing Director. After overseeing the launch of the 'Brian the Robot' campaign and later toy promotions, Russell left the role in May 2015 to take up the role of CMO at online estate agents Purplebricks.com. In late 2015, Paul Troy was appointed the CMO role at Confused.com. Troy had previously worked for Moneysupermarket between 2011 and 2013 where he created the 'You're so money supermarket' campaign.

In September 2017, Louise O'Shea was appointed as CEO of Confused.com taking over from Martin Coriat who himself was appointed as chief executive of Admiral-owned French comparison website LeLynx. O'Shea was promoted to the CEO position from her role as finance director at Confused.com.

In May 2018, Confused.com announced the appointment of Sam Day as chief marketing officer, replacing Troy.

In March 2023, Steve Dukes was appointed as the CEO of Confused.com as Louise O'Shea stepped down from the role after almost 6 years. Dukes joined Confused.com as the company's first Chief Operating Officer in 2019. Before joining Confused.com, Dukes was in product leadership and general management roles in high growth companies within the financial services and eCommerce sectors. He was CEO at Commuter Club.

== Advertising ==
In early years, Confused.com achieved success with a simple, repetitive direct response advertising format, in which a man described what Confused.com was offering, with a slightly different variant being used from 2003 until 2005. This led to the longest running of Confused.com's campaigns, starting from 2005 until 2008, featuring simple cardboard props on a white background, later with people saying they were "Confused.com" by the depicted marketplace. In later years as competitors Moneysupermarket.com, Go.Compare and Compare the Market have entered the market, Confused.com has tried numerous different advertising vehicles. None have emulated the success of the initial campaign and Confused.com has slipped from the position of market leader to being the fourth largest car insurance comparison website in the UK. The popularity of the company's slogan 'Confused.com' rose to prominence after the success of the 2002 campaign. A 2002 study by Webster showed that the slogan was the third most used phrase of the year behind 'Hey you' and 'Naughty Soldier'.

Later adverts, starting around the year of 2009, contained real life testimonials, featured customers and prolific social media users such as Phil Lester talking about their experiences while using the website, as well as showcasing the website's simplicity by explaining how it works.

Adverts in early 2010 focused on the concept of regret and featured members of the public lamenting that they could have purchased something they wanted if they had purchased their car insurance through Confused.com.

In September 2010, Confused.com introduced the character of "Cara Confused" a wild-haired animated version of the original company mascot that was present on the former Confused.com logo. The inspiration for the creation of Cara came from Kate Armstrong, the founder and former managing director of Confused.com. The campaign used the tagline, "it pays to be Confused.com". In February 2011 an advert started featuring Cara (voiced by West End star Louise Dearman) singing the Diana Ross track "Chain Reaction". Marketing Director Mike Hoban claimed that this campaign gained Confused.com 2 million customers since launch.

On 1 June 2013, a campaign launched featuring a robot named Brian, depicted as being on a mission to help people to "save pounds". On 24 December 2014, an advert was launched where scrap dealers kidnap Brian. Instead of melting him down straight away, they leave him hanging through the night on a magnet. However, his robot friends at headquarters receive his distress call and go to help him. A couple of weeks later the succeeding advert shows the same five co-robots, known as the Herberts (Chief Herbert, Miss Herbert, Stunt Herbert, Clever Herbert and Baby Herbert), go to help Brian. They stop the incinerator at the last moment, saving Brian and continuing the 'Brian' advertising campaigns after they repair him in March 2015. In August 2015, an advert was launched featuring Brian and the Herberts dancing to "Jump on It!" promoting the then brand new Brian toy available by buying insurance through Confused.com. In early 2016, two more toys were launched, Miss Herbert and Stunt Herbert, with a corresponding campaign showing both characters competing with each other to promote their respective toys.

On 1 August 2016, the adverts featuring the Robots were scrapped in favour of a new advertisement featuring James Corden.

On 17 August 2018, following a run of five adverts, James Corden was replaced in favour of a new direction and new frontman Timothy Murphy. The advert features Murphy driving a car through a busy mass of confusing messaging and advertising before ending with Murphy driving down a clear road. This advert and all subsequent adverts featured Link Wray's Rumble.

In subsequent years, the brand transitioned its creative account to Leo Burnett U.K., launching major new platform directions. In May 2024, Confused.com introduced its new major brand platform "Just Used Confused". Created to act as an antidote to the stress and joylessness of sorting out insurance, the campaign centered around an infectious, lighthearted soundtrack featuring Roger Whittaker's "Finnish Whistler," celebrating the feeling of relief and saving money.

Building on this success, the platform expanded into 2025 and 2026—including whimsical follow-ups featuring ballooning, floating bodies and the August 2026 "Feels like…" campaign—to reinforce the simplicity of comparing car and home insurance amidst rising living costs.

The ads parody the songs like "Y.M.C.A." by Village People and "Chain Reaction" by Diana Ross.

== Sponsorship ==
Confused.com has sponsored programmes on ITV such as Who Wants to Be a Millionaire? (including the drama series Quiz, due to its association with Millionaire), Ninja Warrior UK, Sunday Night at the Palladium, Celebrity Squares, Catchphrase and Emmerdale, and The Simpsons on Sky Showcase (formerly Sky One & Sky 1). It also previously sponsored the ITV National Weather. In 2019, along with Land Rover, they were a sponsor of ITV's coverage of the 2019 Rugby World Cup.

== See also ==
- MoneySuperMarket
- Compare the Market
- Uswitch
- Go.Compare
