= Andrea Coscelli =

British economist and businessman (born 1969)

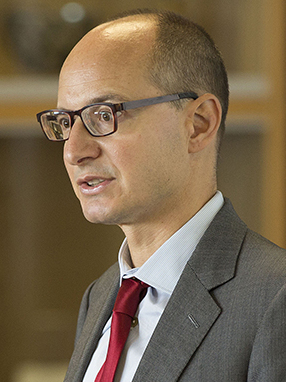
- Coscelli in 2016

Partner and Head of Europe, Keystone Strategy
- Incumbent
- Assumed office January 2023
- Prime Minister: Theresa May; Boris Johnson; Liz Truss

Personal details
- Born: 11 February 1969 (age 57)
- Education: Stanford University; Bocconi University

Andrea Coscelli CBE (born 11 February 1969) is an Italian-British economist and businessperson serving as Partner and Head of Europe at Keystone Strategy.

== Education ==
Coscelli was born on 11 February 1969 and is from Parma, Emilia-Romagna. Coscelli completed a laurea in Economics at Bocconi University, Italy. He completed a PhD in economics from Stanford University After graduating from Stanford, Coscelli chose to move to the United Kingdom instead of return to his native Italy.

== Early career ==
Coscelli co-founded the not-for-profit organisation, the Association of Competition Economics (ACE) in 2003 which aims to bring together competition economists working in government, academia and the private sector to debate and discuss policies and specific cases. He previously held roles at Ofcom, as director of economic analysis and Charles River Associates, as vice president (partner) in the firm's competition practice in London.

== Competition and Markets Authority ==
Coscelli joined the CMA in November 2013 as executive director, markets and mergers (the executive board member leading the directorate responsible for UK merger control, the markets regime and the CMA's work in regulated sectors). Coscelli was the chief executive of the CMA between July 2016 and July 2022.

In July 2021, the CMA stepped up its enforcement action against powerful tech firms under Coscelli's leadership, with the Wall Street Journal reporting on the cases launched against Apple, Facebook and Google and a rise in the CMA's casework following the UK's exit from the European Union.

In November 2022, it was announced that Coscelli would join Keystone Strategy LLC as co-head of its European operations.

== Honours and recognition ==
Coscelli was appointed Commander of the Order of the British Empire (CBE) in the 2020 New Year Honours for services to competitive markets.

In 2019, Business Insider named Coscelli 81st in their list of the 100 most influential people shaping British technology in 2019 after the CMA announced it was investigating Amazon's anticipated acquisition of Deliveroo.

In 2019, Coscelli was ranked 33rd in Influence Weekly's list of '100 Most Influential People in Influencer Marketing' following the CMA's consumer enforcement work to secure formal commitments from 16 celebrity influencers to stop undisclosed advertising in their social media posts.
