= Zelda La Grange =

Private secretary to Nelson Mandela

Zelda la Grange
- Born: 29 October 1970 (age 55); Boksburg, South Africa
- Occupation: Private Secretary
- Writing career
- Genre: Politics

Zelda la Grange (born 29 October 1970) is a former private secretary to Nelson Mandela. La Grange was born in Boksburg, South Africa. She completed a 3-year National Diploma at the Tshwane University of Technology. From 1994 until 1996, she served as a typist for Mary Mxadana, private secretary to Nelson Mandela, the newly elected post-apartheid President of South Africa. In 1996, she was promoted to assistant private secretary, and in 1999 she was again promoted to Private Secretary to the Office of the President. She was a founding staff member of the Nelson Mandela Foundation which served as post-Presidential office for Nelson Mandela.

== Controversy ==
On 17 January 2015, La Grange stated on her official Twitter account that she felt that President Jacob Zuma was making white South Africans feel unwelcome in the country by saying that all of South Africa's problems started when Jan van Riebeeck arrived at the Cape in 1652. Her several tweets on the issue prompted a significant public backlash (with some coming out in Zelda's defence), including a reaction from Zuma, leading her to issue an apology later that day.

== Bibliography ==
- Good Morning, Mr. Mandela, New York: Viking, 2014 ISBN 978-0-525-42828-2
