= Go.Compare =

British financial services comparison website

GoCompare.com Limited
- Trade name: Go.Compare
- Type: Limited company
- Industry: Price comparison
- Founded: November 2006
- Founder: Hayley Parsons
- Headquarters: Cardiff, Wales, UK
- Area served: United Kingdom
- Key people: Lee Griffin (President); Kevin Li Ying (CEO)
- Services: Financial services
- Revenue: £191.8 million (2025)
- Owner: Future plc
- Parent: Future plc
- Website: www.gocompare.com

GoCompare.com Limited, trading as Go.Compare, (Note: Formerly GoCompare (from 2017 to 2022) and GoCompare.com (until 2017)) is a financial services comparison company based in Cardiff, Wales. Its website provides comparison details for financial products including car insurance, home and pet insurance and breakdown cover. Since 2021 it has been owned by Future plc. The company's advertising campaign in 2015 was voted as the "most irritating advertisement."

The company is authorised and regulated by the Financial Conduct Authority (FCA) in the UK and is the only comparison website invited to join the British Insurance Brokers Association (BIBA).

== History ==
Go Compare was established in November 2006. The company's founder was Hayley Parsons, who worked for Admiral Insurance for 14 years, and was formerly head of business development at Confused.com.

It was the first comparison site to focus on features of insurance products rather than just listing prices, which led to the company being invited to become a member of the British Insurance Brokers Association (BIBA).

The company was 49% owned by insurance company esure by 2011 and on 8 December 2014, esure acquired Go Compare in a deal worth £95 million. Following the acquisition, Parsons was replaced as CEO by Jon Morrell in March 2015.

In November 2016 the company was the subject of a demerger from esure. In November 2017, ZPG's offer to buy the company for £460 million was rejected.

In December 2017, GoCompare announced the acquisition of MyVoucherCodes, one of the UK's largest online voucher code sites, in a £36.5m deal.

In November 2020, GoCompare agreed to a £594m takeover offer from Future plc, Britain's biggest magazines publisher.

Since 2021, the company has been led by Lee Griffin, one of its original founders. The company moved to Hodge House in Cardiff in September 2024.

In March 2025, the company acquired the RNWL app, which was subsequently rebranded as Renewal. This app offers a secure platform for storing insurance policies and important documents. The Renewal app collaborates with Go.Compare to deliver a comprehensive solution for consumers' financial management requirements. In July 2025, Go.Compare was reported to be the second most profitable company in Cardiff, reporting a pre-tax profit of £72.3 million in the year to September 2024, up from £46.2 million the previous year.

Since the takeover by Future plc, Go.Compare has been reported as a separate operating segment of Future plc. In the financial year ending 30 September 2025 the segment recorded revenue of £191.8 million, down from £202.7 million the previous year, and accounted for around 26 per cent of Future's group revenue.

== Services ==
GoCompare provides a comparison service for vehicle, life insurance in conjunction with its partners Neilson Financial Services, home and pet insurance, and breakdown cover. It also provides comparison services for travel insurance, gas and electricity, broadband, loans, credit cards, mortgages and other financial products through preferred providers such as Energylinx and Experian. On 14 August 2012, the company launched "Covered mag", an online magazine that claims to be "unlike any other financial publication you've ever read".

== Advertising ==
On 19 August 2009, the company launched an advertising campaign featuring a fictional Italian tenor called Gio Compario, played by Wynne Evans. The advertisements feature 'Gio' singing about the company to the tune of "Over There" in various locations. In 2015, the campaign was voted the UK's "most irritating advertisement".

In response to this reaction, Go Compare deliberately subverted the campaign in July 2012 by running a series of adverts where celebrity guests such as Sue Barker, Jimmy Carr, Stuart Pearce, Ray Mears, Louie Spence and Stephen Hawking lined up to "silence" the character of Gio Compario. Marketing officer Kevin Hughes said, "It was risky, but a brand has to listen to its customers." The character returned in July 2015 after an 18-month break, singing as part of what Evans called a "much calmer performance". The character appeared again in 2020 after coronavirus lockdown measures were eased in the UK in July 2020.

In 2023, Go.Compare rebranded to emphasize the ".compare" domain. To launch the rebrand, Go.Compare collaborated with ITV's The Voice and received a bronze award at the 2023 Campaign Media Week Awards for its media sponsorship.

Since 2024, Go.Compare has aimed to modernise its brand, toning down the use of Gio Compario and focusing more on how the brand makes consumers feel when they use the site.

== Public image ==
In September 2007 the company admitted that, on one occasion, an unlawful breach of privacy had taken place with regard to the passing on of data provided by customers. It said that this was the result of a breach of contract by a sub-contractor, Performance Direct, and stated that it would take immediate action to prevent it happening again.

In January 2008 the site was banned for a time by Google due to "irregular inbound links". This resulted in its share of search traffic for the term "car insurance" reducing from 17.49% to 2.31%. Gocompare.com was banned again in April 2009.

In 2015, Go.Compare launched a tech-driven fraud prevention service, reducing fraud rates. This service was expanded in 2018 with additional layers of protection. In 2019, the company became the only price comparison website to join the Insurance Fraud Bureau, reflecting their dedication to combating fraud.

In August 2019 the company received criticism from road safety organisations after debuting an advert depicting the Gio Compario character crashing into a tree and flipping over. The Advertising Standards Authority received over 70 complaints regarding the advertisement.

In July 2023, Go.Compare announced a four-year deal with the Welsh Rugby Union (WRU) as back of shirt sponsor, which also supports grassroots rugby development across Wales.
