= Direct Line Group =

British insurance company

Direct Line Insurance Group Ltd.
- Type: Subsidiary
- Industry: Insurance
- Founded: February 2012; 14 years ago
- Founders: Peter Wood; Martin Long
- Headquarters: Bromley, England, UK
- Area served: United Kingdom
- Key people: Owen Morris (Chief Executive Officer)
- Products: General insurance; Finance
- Brands: Direct Line; Churchill; Privilege; Green flag; Direct Line Group Auto Services; By Miles; Darwin; Direct Line for Business; Churchill Business; Churchill Expert; CaHa!; Brolly (defunct); Shotgun (defunct)
- Owner: Aviva
- Number of employees: 10,200 (2024)
- Subsidiaries: UK Insurance Limited; UK Insurance Services Limited

Direct Line Insurance Group Ltd. is a British insurance company based in Bromley, England. It was formed in 2012 by the divestment of The Royal Bank of Scotland Group's (RBS) insurance division, through an initial public offering. The company owns a number of insurance subsidiaries, providing various insurance products, including Direct Line and Churchill Insurance, Darwin as well as the roadside assistance and vehicle recovery provider Green Flag.

The group was listed on the London Stock Exchange until it was acquired by Aviva in July 2025.

== History ==
The company was originally established in 1985 by Peter Wood and Martin Long, as the insurance division of The Royal Bank of Scotland Group (RBS). It was the first telephone only insurance company in the United Kingdom. In September 2012, the group's then chief executive, Paul Geddes, announced the business was "operating as a standalone insurance company", in advance of a future full divestment from the RBS Group.

The company was the subject of an initial public offering (IPO) in October 2012. RBS sold a 30% share of the business in the IPO, and sold a further 17% in March 2013, reducing its holding in the business to 48.5%. RBS sold a further 20% in September 2013, and sold the remainder of its holding in February 2014.

Direct Line sold its TRACKER Network UK telematics business to the private equity firm Lysanda in February 2014. In September 2014, it was announced that Mapfre would acquire the Italian and German businesses of Direct Line, for a sum of €550 million. The company also made a number of tough financial decisions in 2014, including abandoning some lines of business, making redundancies, and closing 14 of their 27 offices in the United Kingdom.

In February 2019, Direct Line announced it would be appointing chief financial officer Penny James as the CEO. In January 2023, Jonathan Greenwood become acting chief executive after James agreed with the board to step down after two successive profit warnings and a dividend cancellation.

In November 2023, Direct Line Insurance Group announced that they set to cut about 550 jobs as part of a turnaround plan aimed at saving £50 million ($64 million) in 2025. The reductions would eliminate about 6% of its roughly 9,000 employees.

Adam Winslow took over as CEO in the first quarter of 2024. In February 2024 it was reported that the Belgian insurer, Ageas, was considering a bid of around €3.1bn for the company. In March 2024, Ageas announced no offer would be made.

Shares of Direct Line Insurance surged by over 36% in early trading on 28 November 2024 after the company rejected a £3.28 billion ($4.16 billion) takeover offer from rival Aviva, stating the offer "substantially undervalued" the company. Despite the surge, Direct Line's stock remained below the proposed offer price of 250 pence per share. Analysts from Jefferies suggested that a higher bid could be possible if Direct Line’s board engages with Aviva.

On 23 December 2024, Aviva reached an agreement to buy the company at a price which valued it at £3.70 billion. The transaction needed shareholder consent and approval from the Competition and Markets Authority. The Competition and Markets Authority and the Court approved the scheme on 1 July 2025, allowing the deal to complete. On 1 July 2025, Aviva completed the acquisition of Direct Line. Following the acquisition, Owen Morris was appointed CEO, replacing Winslow, on 2 July 2025.

Direct Line Group was fined £10.6m by the Prudential Regulation Authority in March 2026 for miscalculating its solvency ratios in 2023 and 2024.

== Operations ==
The group owns a number of general insurance brands operating within the United Kingdom, including Direct Line, Direct Line for Business, Churchill Insurance, Privilege, Darwin and Green Flag. Direct Line is a company that specialises in selling insurance and other financial services, sold directly to consumers by telephone and the internet.

== Subsidiaries ==
=== Darwin ===
Darwin was founded in 2019 and led by Sumit Bahukhandi. The company only sells through price comparison websites, initially Moneysupermarket, and is built in the Amazon Web Services cloud. It uses a different pricing model to other companies in the group, and acts as a test bed for new ideas.

=== Direct Line for Business ===
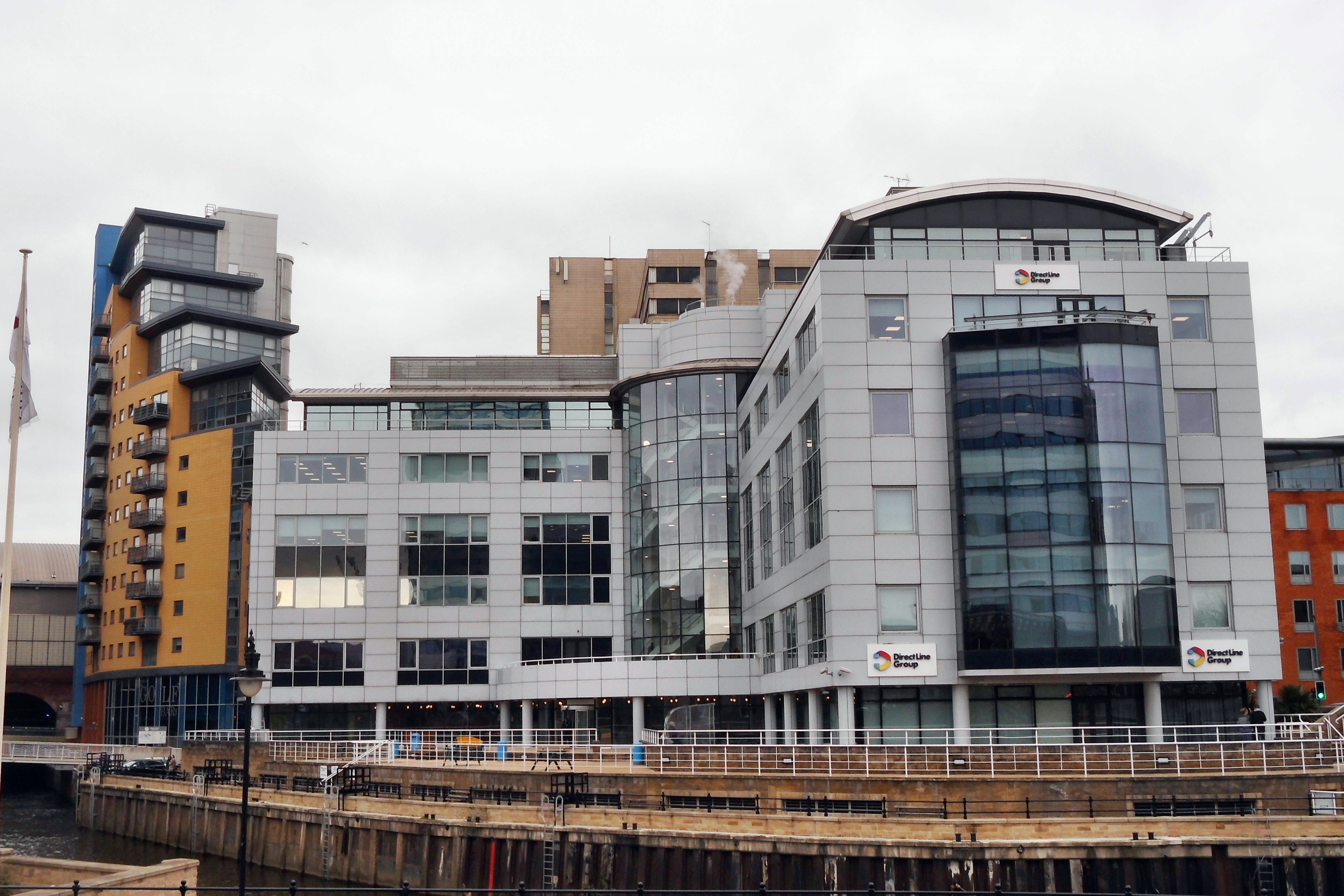
Direct Line Building, Leeds

Direct Line for Business was founded in Leeds in September 2007, and as of December 2020 has 811,000 customers. Since 2010, the company has been led by Jasvinder Gakhal, who has been the director since 2014. The company appointed Claire Sadler as marketing director in October 2017.

Direct Line for Business used PricewaterhouseCoopers to improve their product, and in July 2018, the firm launched a new advertising campaign, with Saatchi and Saatchi London.

In the summer of 2019, Direct Line for Business announced that it was cosponsoring the creation of click and mortar pop up shops at ten locations across the United Kingdom, with cosponsors Amazon, Square, and the small business support network Enterprise Nation. The shops offer twenty small online brands the chance to sell their products, meet customers and experience selling on the High Street for the first time.

=== Direct Line Motability ===
Direct Line Motability (DLM) was founded in 2023 after Direct Line took over as the insurer for Motability Operations from RSA Insurance Group. As part of the move, Direct Line acquired a 17,000 sq ft office at 1 St Paul's Square, Liverpool with all RSA Motability staff based at the nearby capital building being transferred to DLM.
