= RIM-900 =

One of the first wireless data devices

The RIM-900 was one of the first wireless data devices, marketed as a two-way pager. It operated on the Mobitex network. It was a clam shell device that could fit on a belt. It had a small QWERTY keyboard for sending and receiving email and interactive messages.

The product was introduced as Inter@ctive Paging in 1996 by Research in Motion and RAM Mobile Data.
