= Smash Martians =

Food advertising characters

Smash Martian figures made from car parts

The Smash Martians were the stars of a series of 1970s and early 1980s TV advertising campaigns for Smash instant mashed potato in the UK. They were a family of Martian robots who would watch humans laboriously preparing mashed potato the traditional way on TV. The robots would then mock what they saw by chortling as they heard how the "Earth people peeled their own potatoes with their metal knives, boiled them for twenty of their minutes, then smashed them all to bits" – instead of using Smash instant mash. The voices were by Peter Hawkins. The catchphrase 'For Mash Get Smash' became a well-known advertising slogan in the UK. The adverts featuring the Smash Martians were voted TV advert of the century by Campaign magazine.

The Martians' behaviour and personalities were initially developed while the puppeteers were messing around on set.

The Smash Martians were designed for the advertising agency Boase Massimi Pollitt by Sian Vickers and Chris Wilkins, also responsible for the four-wheeled red telephone used to advertise Direct Line, the GoCompare opera singer, Sheilas' Wheels commercials and Mr. Mouse, a blue American rodent advertising the insurance group Esure.

Unauthorised copies of the Martians were made from car parts by workers at the Ford Halewood factory near Liverpool.

== Today ==
Three of the Smash Martians puppets used in the Cadbury's Smash adverts can be found in the National Media Museum, Bradford, West Yorkshire. Other examples are preserved in the Head Office of the current brand owner, Premier Foods, in St Albans.
