= Adam Winslow =

British businessman

- Born: 1979 (age 46–47); United Kingdom
- Education: University of York, ESCP Business School
- Occupation: Business executive
- Known for: Chief executive officer of Direct Line Group
- Father: Peter Winslow

Adam Winslow (born 1979 or 1980) is a British businessman who served as the chief executive officer of Direct Line Group from January 2024 to July 2025.

== Career ==
Winslow served as Aviva's UK and Ireland CEO of general insurance from 2021 to 2024. He was announced as the new chief executive of Direct Line Group in August 2023 and was appointed in the first quarter of 2024. Succeeding Jonathan Greenwood who had been appointed acting chief executive following the resignation of Penny James in January 2023. Winslow resigned in July 2025.

In July 2026, he was named as the chief executive of CFC insurance.

== Personal life ==
He is the son of multi-millionaire Peter Winslow, a co-founder of price comparison website Compare the Market.
