= Turbo Dispatch =

Turbo Dispatch is a public domain standard for the electronic transfer of job details, initially using packet radio, but now also using the internet. It is used throughout the United Kingdom to pass the details of stranded motorists between all the major UK motoring organisations and their 400 plus vehicle recovery agents. In many cases it is also used by the vehicle recovery agent to pass the details to the attending recovery vehicle.

== History ==
The very first standards meeting in 1994 (Boys with their Toys)

On 30 June 1994, a group of representatives from the UK seven major motoring organisations and the Institute of Vehicle Recovery were invited a meeting at Brooklands Museum. Brooklands Museum was chosen as the venue because the meeting's chairman Andy Lambert was involved with the museum, having transported the vast majority of the exhibits there, and could therefore show people items they would not normally get to see. He clearly hoped that this would be enough incentive to get ‘the clubs’ to sit-down in the same room together. It soon emerged that it was a shared dream of all those present that ‘common standards’ for all aspects of vehicle recovery could be introduced to the industry. Amongst other things, this group laid the foundations of Turbo Dispatch project.

Because of the reliability of delivery needed it was decided that Mobitex should be used. In the UK, there was only one provider of Mobitex, namely RAM Data, which later became a subsidiary of BT called Transcomm. This is why many users still refer to RAMing jobs. Ian Lane of Motor Trade Software (MTS) designed and wrote the protocols along with the gateway software. Much pioneering work was carried out during early 1995. In the autumn of 1995, Green Flag and Delta Rescue were the first motoring organisations to start experimenting with transmissions to the garages, with the first genuine job being sent to Southbank Garage at the end of the year.

The point where most recovery operators learned about Turbo Dispatch was during the Association of Vehicle Recovery Operators' AVRO EX 1996. Despite it being Green Flag's 25th Anniversary, the motoring organisation set up a mini ‘Control Room’ at the show and let people see for the first time how the system worked. By the end of that year, the Automobile Association had set up a trial in London, sending jobs to selected recovery operators.

Towards the end of 1997, the AA's Evan Anderson became greatly involved in promoting the concept of Turbo Dispatch within the AA. This was undoubtedly the turning point, because Evan seemed to accept that although MTS and RAM did have a monopoly, it was not an intentional one. Anyone else could develop a system, but quite simply nobody else had successfully done so.

In the following year, the RAC went live and by the end of the year all the major players in the industry had adopted Turbo Dispatch. By the year 2005, it is estimated that around 92% of the 4 million ‘garaged’ breakdowns a year were sent to recovery operators using Turbo Dispatch.

The system is clearly popular with motoring organisations, because of the saving in job dispatcher talking on the telephone to recovery operators. What surprised a lot of people was how popular it was with the operators as well, mainly for the same reasons. A busy controller does not want to take job details over the telephone, when he can have it appear on his computer screen. Because he could then use the same system to dispatch the job to his driver, it meant the whole process could be handled in seconds.

== Technical review ==
The following notes describe the method of automatically transferring job details from a motoring organisation (or club's) computer into their recovery operator's computer using the Mobitex data network. Since each of the motoring organisations is likely to have its own unique computer system and working practices, it is not practical to attempt to define how automatic job transfer would be best achieved for them. Consequently, only a typical recovery operator's computer installation is defined below.

Typically, the recovery operator job logging and invoicing system is based around a personal computer. This will be connected to the Mobitex data network by a Masc. radio modem (sometimes called a Mobidem) using one of the PC's RS-232 communication ports. Job transmission will entail the motoring organisation's computer using the recovery operator's unique Mobidem number to call his computer.

Once a connection has been made, the job details are transmitted in the data format defined in the Turbo Dispatch Format Manual, and the call terminated. A dedicated communications computer will usually be employed to constantly monitor the radio modem via the RS232 port. This will operate a program TD.EXE, running under Windows. Data received from the radio modem will be transferred to an incoming message queue on the other computer, for subsequent automatic processing by the main job taking software (a maximum of 5 seconds delay). An audible sound will also be generated by the communications computer.

Immediately the job details are received by the recovery operator's communications computer, it will transmit an automatic acknowledgement to the origin of the job message and place the job details in a queue awaiting manual acceptance by the recovery operator's controller. Job Dispatch will be completed by the recovery operator's controller, either by accepting, or rejecting the job and the corresponding transaction being dispatched to the motoring organisation.

The Turbo Dispatch application was initially restricted to employing the MASC protocol of the Transcomm Mobile Data Network. This protocol was adopted because it eliminates the complexity of retries which would result from employing a session based protocol on the radio modems e.g. Hayes or X.28.

== Control ==
Delegates at a standards meeting 2006 at BT Transcomm's Heathrow headquarters

The Turbo Dispatch Standards Group used to meet on average two or three times a year. Its brief was to "Maintain a common standard for message and data formats to be used in electronic data communications between host computers and/or data terminals in fixed/mobile environments".

All major motoring organisations send representatives and all changes/additions to the standard are discussed and must be agreed by all those present at the meeting. As there is little commercial advantage to any organisation (an improvement for one will normally also benefit the others), there is usually a large amount of agreement.

In 2010, BT Transcomm announced the closure of the Mobitex Network in the UK.

Following a competitive tender process including Presentations with solutions from MTT, BT, Vodafone and Apex Networks, it was unanimously awarded to Apex Networks Ltd and the migration from MTT Turbo Dispatch to an Internet-based solution named Automotive Network Services (ANS) took place in 2012. Apex Networks already had a growing number of users for their new Recovery Management System (RMS) which had initially been developed for Ontime Rescue & Recovery.

From 2012, the ANS Standards group now meet quarterly and the forum is attended by the vehicle recovery software providers, namely Apex Networks, MTT and Laserbyte, along with the major motoring organisations and two industry advisers (independent recovery operators that are end-users of the systems). These Meetings normally last for around 3 hours and are held at the Rhodes Arts Complex in Bishop's Stortford, or at various venues around the country provided by the Motoring Organisations (Clubs). The forum was chaired for many years by David Brinklow (Commercial Director of Apex Networks), but more recent has been chaired by J.P. Dekker (of Apex Networks)
