= Sheilas' Wheels =

UK car insurance brand

Sheilas' Wheels is a car insurance and now household and travel insurance brand based in the United Kingdom that was initially targeted exclusively towards women, after research showed that female drivers were generally more cautious, made fewer claims and had different requirements to men. This changed in March 2011 however, as a consequence of the EU Gender Directive, which stated that "insurers in Europe will have to charge the same prices to women and men for the same insurance products without distinction on the grounds of sex", giving insurance companies until 20 December 2012 to eliminate any gender bias in their pricing. The brand, named after the Australian slang term "sheila" for "woman", was launched in October 2005 by Peter Wood, and is part of Esure, the insurance group he founded with HBOS in February 2000.

The brand has achieved fame through its advertising featuring The Sheilas, three women clad in pink sequinned dresses who sing a variety of jingles promoting Sheilas' Wheels (e.g. "For bonzer car insurance deals, Girls get on to Sheilas' Wheels"), often from the seats of a bubblegum pink convertible – sometimes referred to as "The Sheilamobile".

== The Sheilas ==
Sheilas' Wheels and the three Sheilas themselves have been the subject of much media attention, and have regularly featured in polls of irritating but effective advertising. In one of the early adverts set in an Australian outback bar, "Joe Scully" (Shane Connor) of Neighbours can be seen.

The Sheilas themselves are all accomplished singers and performers who began performing as The Sheilas during 2006 at gigs in the United Kingdom – often at gay clubs and student venues – they are Cathi Ogden, Carly Romain and Emma Robbins. Ogden is the only true Australian of the three; Robbins is sister to Ted Robbins, Amy Robbins and Kate Robbins, and was married to Simon Shelton who played Tinky Winky in the Teletubbies, and is a second cousin of Paul McCartney and aunt of The Inbetweeners actress Emily Atack.

In the television adverts, the girls usually appear with Romain on the left, Ogden centre and Robbins on the right (with dark hair). In an interview with Huma Quereshi in The Observer, Emma Robbins said appearing in the advertisements was "like being a giant Barbie doll".

== Sheilas' Wheels Adverts ==
Since their launch, the Sheilas' Wheels adverts have grown over one hundred video tributes, parodies and imitations on YouTube, including a song by the Amateur Transplants. The Sheilas' Wheels car in the advert is a 'shell' and not a working car. It was created by heavily adapting the body of an old American car. There is a second working car, which is similar to the one in the advert that is used for promotional purposes.

It is a 1957 Ford Mercury Monterey convertible that the company bought in 2007 on eBay and restored. The car lives in a warehouse of a specialist company in Surrey, who rent out and sometimes sell American vehicles. The music for the Sheilas' Wheels adverts was composed by John Altman, arranged by Jeff Wayne Music and sung by Cathi Ogden, Carly Romain and Emma Robbins.

== The Sheilas single ==
In October 2007, The Sheilas released a single, (I'm So) Happy Happy (You're Mine), produced by Stock Aitken Waterman with Ogden doing the lead vocal on this recording. The single peaked at number 91.

== History ==
The brand was originally conceived by copywriter Chris Wilkins and his creative partner and wife, Sian Vickers. The two had previously worked with Peter Wood during the 1990s. Wilkins was the copywriter of the famous advert by Cadbury's, Smash Martians, which is often cited among the most memorable adverts of all time.

The Sheilas' Wheels car insurance product introduced a number of female focused benefits that differentiated it from competitors, such as enhanced cover for handbags in cars, female friendly repairers and a free counselling service with its comprehensive cover. Peter Wood launched the brand at "luxury, beauty store" Jo Malone on Sloane Street, London in October 2005.

In February 2007, Sheilas' Wheels ran a competition for members of the public to appear in their television adverts, Make Me a Sheila Star, which attracted over 11,000 applicants including babies, boys, girls, men and women, with the youngest being 18 months, and the oldest 98. In the end, thirty members of the public appeared in two adverts: one featuring a twelve person pyramid of women on the back of the Sheilamobile, and one featuring them in a stretched version.

In January 2008, Sheilas’ Wheels began sponsoring the ITV National Weather, with a series of clips showing the Sheilas in a variety of weather conditions. Prior to sponsorship by Sheilas' Wheels, the ITV National Weather had been sponsored by E.ON (formerly Powergen) for eighteen years – the first and longest running sponsorship deal in television history in the United Kingdom.

In March 2011, a European Court of Justice ruling stated that price discrimination based on gender breaches EU rules on equality. A spokesman from Sheilas’ Wheels parent company Esure stated that "premiums will rise drastically for young female drivers" but the company later clarified that its existing female dominated customer base would likely see only modest premium increases. In 2012 Sheilas' Wheels had more than 450,000 female drivers insured compared to fewer than 50,000 male.
