= Churchill Insurance =

British insurance company

- Type: Wholly owned subsidiary
- Industry: Financial services
- Founded: 1989; 37 years ago
- Founder: Martin Long
- Headquarters: Bromley, England
- Products: Insurance
- Parent: Direct Line Group
- Website: churchill.com

Churchill Insurance is a British insurance company based in Bromley, London. Founded in 1989, as one of the country's first direct to customer car insurance companies, the company has expanded to offer a range of general insurance products. Since February 2012, Churchill is part of the Direct Line Group; policies are underwritten by the parent U K Insurance Limited.

Churchill is notable for its advertising that features a talking nodding dog mascot.

== History ==
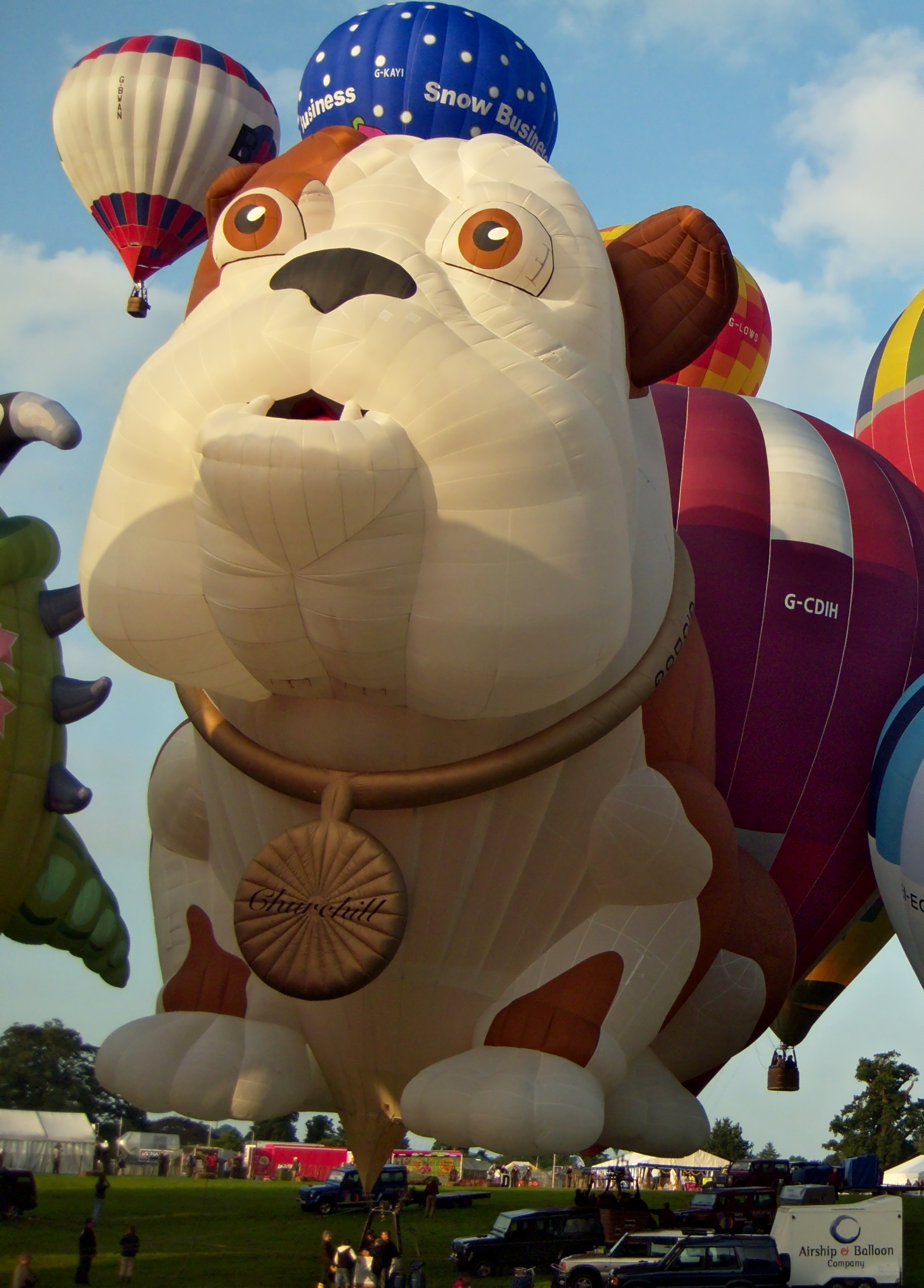
Churchill Insurance mascot as a hot air balloon (registration G-CDOG), Bristol International Balloon Fiesta 2009

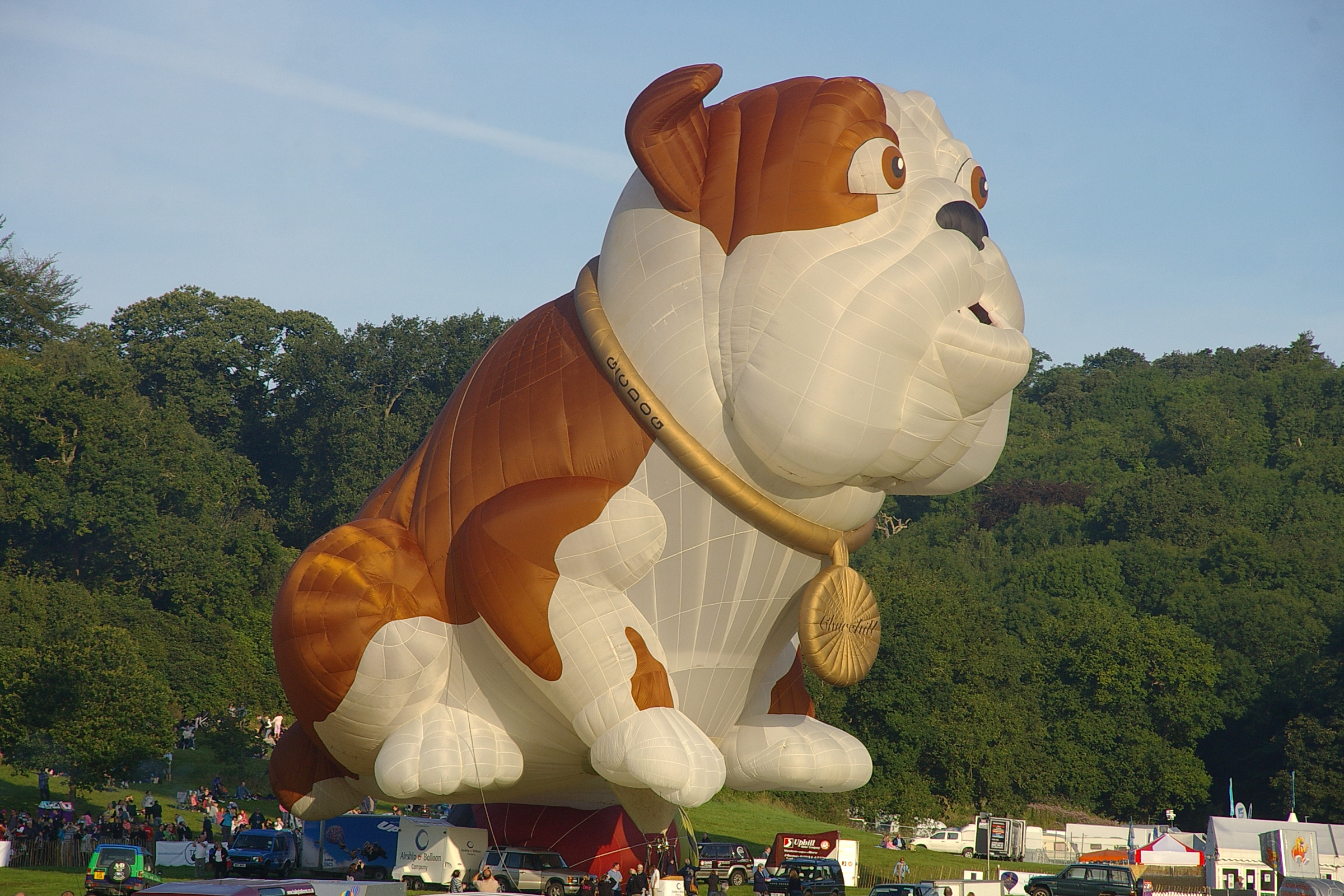
Churchill dog balloon, side view

Churchill Insurance was launched by founder Martin Long in 1989 as a direct car insurance provider. Long was backed by Winterthur, at that time a Credit Suisse subsidiary. Home insurance was added to the Churchill product range a year later. In 1994, the company began to use a bulldog as its mascot.

In 1995, Churchill launched its first website, and a credit card. It also became the first United Kingdom insurer to offer motor insurance estimates via interactive media kiosks.

In 1996, Churchill achieved accreditation with Investors in People and ISO9002. The same year, the nodding dog was introduced to its advertising and breakdown cover was added to the product range. The dog mascot is named Winston Churchill, after the former Prime Minister of the same name.

In 1997, Churchill Insurance was named in Britain's Best Employers for the first time, the year the company relocated to its current headquarters, Churchill Court. Travel insurance and pet insurance products were introduced. In October 1999, motorcycle insurance broker Devitt Insurance was acquired. The company also launched its first e commerce facility, enabling online car and home insurance quotes.

In 2000, it acquired the Churchill.com domain name for online activity, and acquired NIG in February 2000, after announcing their intentions to acquire it in December 1999.

In February 2002, Churchill bought Prudential's insurance business. In June 2003, the business was purchased by the Royal Bank of Scotland Group for £1.1 billion. This brought Churchill into RBS' insurance division alongside Direct Line – another company Long had been involved in launching.

Following the bailout of RBS by the Government of the United Kingdom in 2008, the European Union demanded that certain group assets be sold off, including the insurance division. In February 2012, Churchill became part of the new Direct Line Group, which was created ahead of a divestment that was completed in February 2014.

== Services ==
Churchill offers a range of general insurance products, underwritten by United Kingdom Insurance: car, home, pet and travel insurance and breakdown cover, in association with Green Flag. They also offer life insurance in association with Legal & General and motorbike insurance, arranged through Devitt Insurance Brokers. One commercial product is available through Churchill: van insurance, arranged and administered by Brightside Insurance Services.

== Awards ==
Churchill has won numerous Your Money Awards for its products:

- Best Online Home and Contents Insurance Provider – 2000, 2004, 2007
- Best Motor Insurance Provider – 2000, 2001, 2002, 2003, 2006 (joint winner with Direct Line), 2008
- Best Online Motor Insurance Provider – 2000, 2001, 2002, 2003, 2006, 2007
- Best Travel Insurance Provider – 2001
- Best Online Pet Insurance Provider – 2004, 2009, 2010
- Best Home and Contents Insurance Provider – 2005, 2008
- Best Pet Insurance Provider – 2008

== Marketing ==
=== Sponsorships ===
In October 1993, Churchill signed a three-year deal to sponsor the World Indoor Bowls Championship.

In August 2000, Churchill became the shirt sponsor of Crystal Palace FC, the football team Martin Long supported and would eventually share the chairmanship of.

=== Advertising ===
In 1994, it was decided that the company needed a mascot to represent the Churchill brand, and differentiate it from the former British Prime Minister, Winston Churchill. A staff competition led to the adoption of a bulldog, a well-known symbol of British identity. The first Churchill dog was a real bulldog called Lucas. The company first used a nodding dog in 1996.

In the company's television advertising, the animated Churchill dog was asked whether he could save people money on their insurance and he responded with his catchphrase: "Oh, yes!" The catchphrase is believed to be an impersonation of Potter the caretaker (played by Deryck Guyler) from the 1970s television series, Please Sir!

Churchill was voiced by Stephen Alan Yorke from 2011 to 2019 and Bob Mortimer from 1996 to 2011. The original adverts had Mortimer's voice responding to questions posed by his comedy partner Vic Reeves to a nodding dog mascot in the back of a car. In April 2005, however, Reeves was removed from the adverts, after he was convicted of drink-driving. Over the years many more ads were launched featuring the Churchill dog, including a campaign alongside such celebrities as Melanie Sykes and Roy Walker from January 2009.

In 2004, a hot air balloon of Churchill, measuring 34 metres wide by 24 metres high, was unveiled. The balloon appears at numerous events across the country, notably the Bristol International Balloon Fiesta and the London Marathon.

In 2006, a high profile "Challenge Churchill" campaign was launched, involving the people of Britain challenging the brand mascot to find them cheaper car and home insurance. In 2009, the company adopted a new strapline: "Count on Churchill".

Bob Mortimer continued to provide the voice for the dog until April 2011, followed by Stephen Alan Yorke, who voiced the character from December 2011 to September 2019, up until the next 'Chill' campaign in which the character no longer spoke.

In recent years, talking soft toys have been added to the range of Churchill merchandise, and the character has a page on social networking site Facebook. Churchill starred in twenty-two pantomimes around the UK in 2009 and in August 2010, he made appearances at Pontins holiday camps before returning for his second pantomime run.

Martin Clunes starred in Churchill's new television campaign from December 2011, with a series of ads featuring Clunes as Churchie's new pet owner until November 2012, when he was removed after being banned from driving. Clunes was replaced by Dawn French as Churchill the dog's new owner in the next series of television adverts from February 2013 until late 2014. A solo advert in May 2013 featured Churchill riding on a kids' ride to the tune of Gary Numan's song "Cars." In February 2015, Dawn French was removed in the adverts as Churchill launches a free talking toy giveaway, the first advert shows Churchill getting ready to go on holiday to Mexico, and the second ad also has him in the museum, pretending to be in a brown and white artwork. In June 2015-January 2018, Churchill goes solo again with his final adverts featuring talking sentient furniture, cars and homes with the new slogan "Depend on the Dog".

Churchill was once again redesigned in October 2019 for the company's new 'Chill' campaign, when his long-serving nodding dog design was replaced by a realistic, non-speaking CGI version.

== Controversy ==
In January 2012, Churchill, along with sister company Direct Line, was fined £2.17m by the Financial Services Authority after being found guilty of altering complaints files.

In February 2013, Churchill received media attention after it appealed against a High Court of Justice judgement in the case of Bethany Probert, who, in 2009 when she was 13 years old, was hit by a car driven by one of the insurer's customers whilst walking along a country lane. The company eventually paid 90% of the claim. Mrs Twyman, 51, said: "Before the accident, Bethany was just a normal teenager. She was a very bright kid A* student - who loved being outside. Since the crash, Bethany has suffered numerous problems, including memory loss, balance problems, and seizures. She uses a wheelchair some of the time.
