= Lisa Morgan =

Lisa Jayne Morgan (born 28 May 1970) is a British businesswomen who served as the CEO of European video game retailer The GAME Group plc (now known as GAME) from 2008 to 2010.

== Career ==
Morgan began her career in business as a toy buyer for Tandy in 1989 when she was 19. She remained there until 1993, when she joined Dixons as a senior buyer. She left Dixons in 1997 to join GAME Group.

She first joined GAME in 1997, and was promoted to commercial director in January 2000. She was promoted to deputy chief executive designate and deputy group chief executive officer in 2004, and assumed the role of chief executive on 31 October 2006, succeeding Martin Long. The Guardian reported in 2008 that Morgan was the highest-paid woman employed by a UK-quoted company in 2007, receiving £4.6 million in salary, including bonuses and share incentives.

She resigned from the company in April 2010. When she left GAME it was reported that she received a payoff estimated to be £1.5 million. She then co-founded the consulting firm Morgan-Knox Limited in Basingstoke, Hampshire in 2011, where she serves as director.

== Personal life ==
Morgan is married with two stepchildren. Her hobbies include horse back riding and dressage.
