= Interactive Pager =

Two-way pager from Research In Motion released in 1996

RAMfirst Interactive Paging logo

The Inter@ctive Pager is a discontinued two-way pager released in 1996 by Research In Motion (later known for the BlackBerry line of smartphones) that allowed users to receive and send messages via the Mobitex wireless network. The US operator of Mobitex, RAM Mobile Data, introduced the Inter@ctive Pager service as RAMfirst Interactive Paging. The device was named '1997 Top Product' by the magazine Wireless for the Corporate User. It is also known as the RIM-900.

The device is credited with introducing features such as peer-to-peer delivery, read receipts, sending faxes to phones and text-to-speech technology.

In August 1998, BellSouth Wireless Data replaced the RIM-900 with the BlackBerry 950 and marketed the service as BellSouth Interactive Paging.
