= Green Flag =

British roadside assistance company

Green Flag Limited
- Formerly: Nationwide Breakdown Recovery Services Limited (1971–1992); National Breakdown Recovery Club Limited (1992–1996)
- Type: Limited company
- Industry: Automotive services
- Founded: February 23, 1971; 55 years ago
- Founder: Bob Slicer and Jeffery Pittock
- Headquarters: Leeds and Glasgow, United Kingdom
- Area served: United Kingdom and Europe
- Services: Breakdown assistance
- Owner: Direct Line Group
- Number of employees: 180
- Parent: Direct Line Group
- Website: greenflag.com

Green Flag Limited is a British roadside assistance and vehicle recovery provider, which is part of the Direct Line Group. Formed in 1971, as the National Breakdown Recovery Club, as an alternative to the AA and RAC, it used a network of local garages and mechanics to deliver recovery and repair services, instead of patrolling mechanics.

Originally based in Low Moor, Bradford, their operations are now controlled in Operations Centres in Leeds and Glasgow, within the Direct Line Group.

== History ==
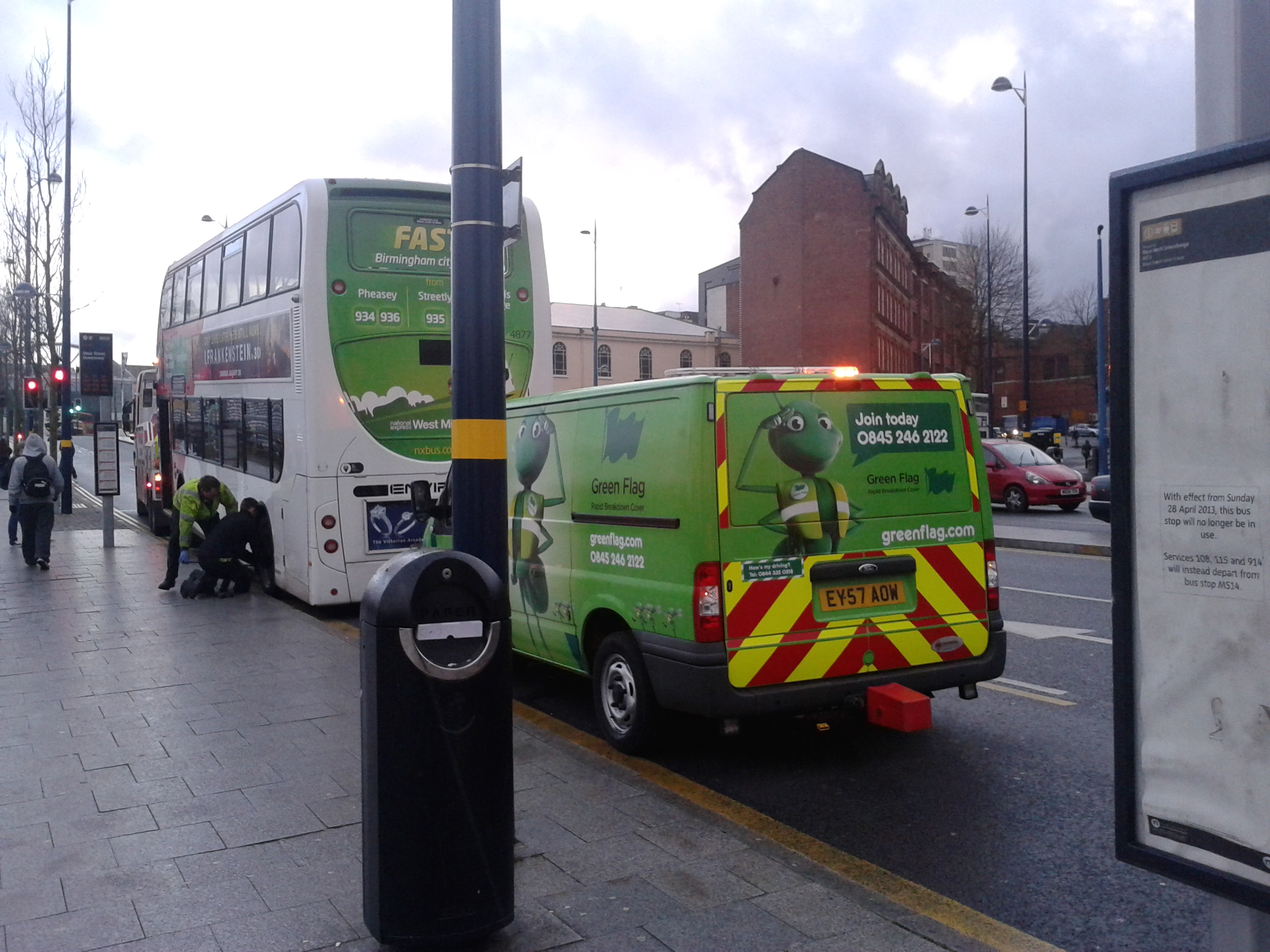
Green Flag van, featuring the Maximili'ant character, attending an NXWM bus in Birmingham

Green Flag started as an idea between two friends, Bob Slicer and Jeffery Pittock, in a pub in Bradford. At the time, the AA and RAC were well established, and offered assistance at the roadside. Slicer and Pittock's National Breakdown Recovery Club operated under a different model, using a network of garages and mechanics that would recover and fix members' cars. The mechanics' local knowledge was meant to provide a swifter response to calls, than the established competition.

When the service began as a three-man business (with Ernest Smith) in 1971, membership only covered breakdowns within a 50-mile radius of their Morley Street base in Bradford and cost £1.50 a year. Within three years, NBRC had become the largest breakdown recovery firm in the country, with over 100,000 members.

In 1984, NBRC was acquired by National Car Parks (NCP),. Five years later, the firm moved to new, purpose-built headquarters in Pudsey, which were opened by Diana, Princess of Wales. The company was renamed Green Flag in 1994 and, under the leadership of Chief Executive Ernest Smith, looked to expand into other insurance services. "Green is the symbol of health in Europe," Smith told The Independent in 1995.

In 1992, a subsidiary was created called Green Flag USA, from acquisition of National Breakdown in Lafayette, LA

NCP was bought out by investment firm Cendant, which put Green Flag up for sale in 1999 after regulators blocked their attempt to also buy RAC. Later that year, Green Flag became part of the RBS Group when it was acquired by Direct Line for £220m. June 2008 saw Green Flag announce that it would be branding four hundred vans across its network, to match its marketing.

In 2011, Green Flag reviewed its network of contractors, reducing the number of partner firms from 283 to 173 } By 2013, five firms represented the majority of Green Flag's network. RBS' insurance division was floated in October 2012 as Direct Line Group. The new company had declared itself a separate entity the previous month.

In 2015, Direct Line Group announced it would consolidate its sites in the Leeds area, with the closure of the Green Flag Operations Centre in Pudsey. All staff were retained and moved to the Group's new site in Leeds at The Wharf buildings, with Green Flag operations in Glasgow continuing as normal.

== Services ==
Green Flag offers a range of breakdown products, from basic roadside assistance to full European cover with recovery, covering cars, motorbikes, trailers and small vans. The company claims an average response time of 42 minutes and that it has over four million customers. Like the rest of the Direct Line Group, Green Flag's products are underwritten by UK Insurance Limited.

Green Flag's services are also available through partners, including Direct Line, Churchill, Privilege, Clydesdale Bank/Yorkshire Bank, RBS/NatWest. They also operate a specialist breakdown service for caravan and motorhome owners, on behalf of the Caravan Club. Green Flag no longer provides coverage for Esure and Sainsbury's Bank customers, these contracts were lost to the RAC following re-tendering.

== Advertising ==
In 2010, mascot Maximili'ant was introduced to Green Flag's marketing. An ant was chosen as the company claims "they're hard working, strong and work well in a team, qualities reflected in the Green Flag network." The character was brought to life by the voice of Harry Hill, in television and radio advertising until 2012.

Green Flag relaunched their advertising in August 2017, changing their motto to "Common Sense to the Rescue" and targeting AA and RAC customers more directly with their campaigns.

== Sponsorships ==
In 1994, Green Flag became the first brand to sponsor the England men's football team. The deal ran to the 1998 FIFA World Cup, including UEFA Euro 1996, and is believed to have cost the firm £4m. The deal ended in July 1998.

Between 2000 and 2002, the company was the main title sponsor of the British Formula 3 Championship and then, between March 2002 to March 2005, the British Touring Car Championship. This was not the company's first motorsport sponsorship, as National Breakdown had sponsored rallies between 1984 and 1987.

In 2004, the company again supported football through sponsorship of AOL's coverage of Euro 2004. The Green Flag logo appeared on the Williams F1 team cars of Nico Rosberg and Kazuki Nakajima (2009) and Rubens Barichello and Nico Hülkenberg (2010) as part of the RBS sponsorship. Green Flag is the current sponsor of British gymnast Nile Wilson. Also in 2014, Green Flag announced that it had become a sponsor of Premiership Rugby.

From June 2015 to July 2016, Green Flag was the sponsor of the ITV National Weather, on ITV and UTV.

== Awards ==
Green Flag is a multiple Your Money award winner. The company was named Best Breakdown Cover Provider in 2004, 2005, 2006, 2007, 2008, 2009, 2010, 2013 and 2014. They were also Best Online Breakdown Cover provider in 2004, 2005, 2006, 2007 and 2014. The Institute of Transport Management recognised Green Flag as the Roadside Assistance Company Of the Year in June 2012.

Green Flag was ranked 9th, after scoring 81.02% in the 2013 Auto Express Driver Power Survey of best breakdown cover providers. This increased to a score of 87.33%, and an improved ranking of 3rd in the newest Auto Express Driver Power Survey in 2014, seeing Green Flag outrank both the AA and RAC.
