= Paul Geddes (businessman) =

British businessman

Paul Geddes is a British businessman.

Geddes earned a PPE degree from the University of Oxford.

He was the chief executive (CEO) of Direct Line Insurance Group, a FTSE 250 company, until May 2019. He was succeeded as CEO of Direct Line by Penny James.

Geddes was a non-executive director of Channel Four Television Corporation. Geddes joined Evelyn Partners in July 2023 and was appointed as chief executive officer on 6 October 2023.
