= Vehicle recovery =

Towing and recovery of automobiles

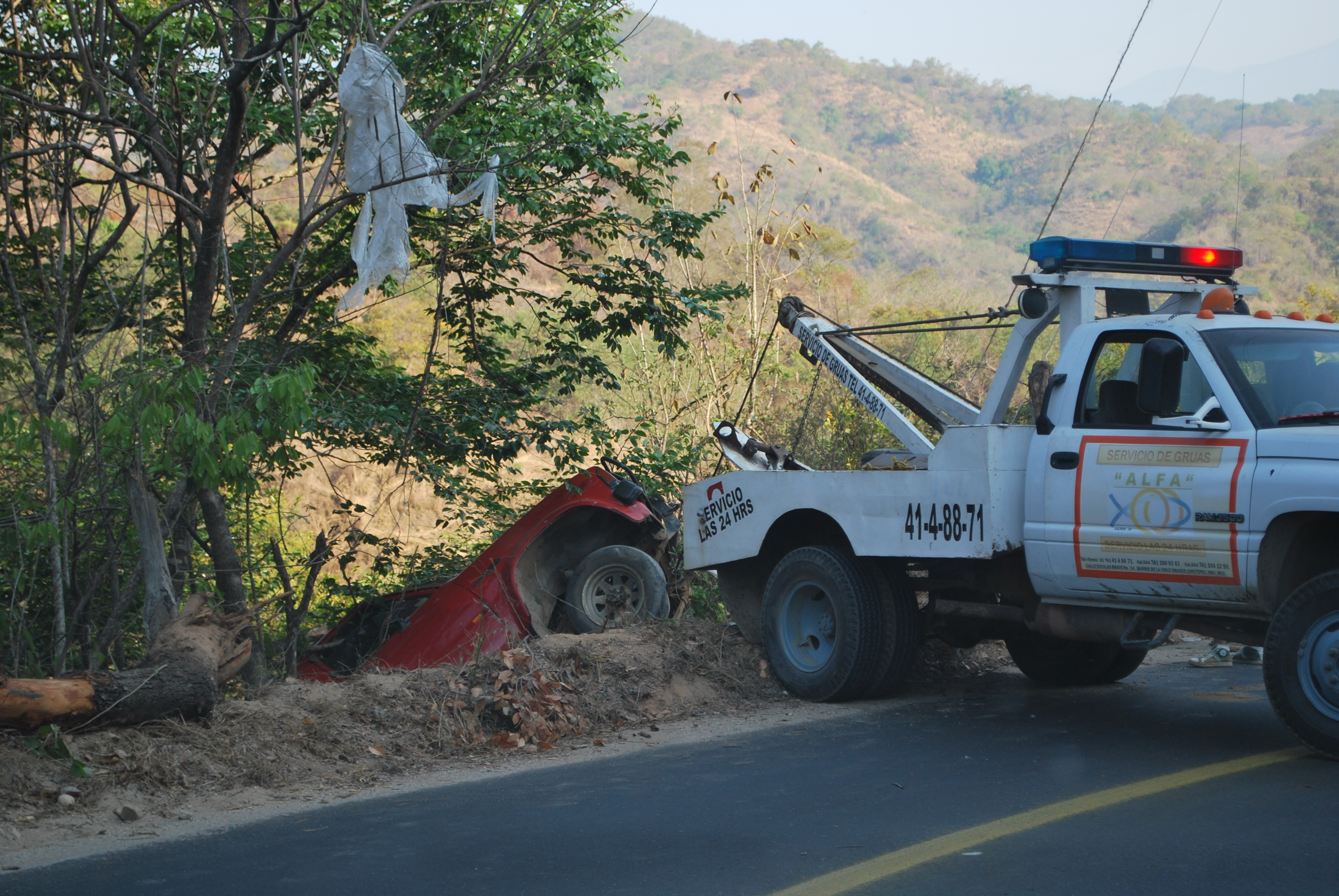
Vehicle recovery in Guerrero, Mexico

Vehicle recovery is the recovery of any vehicle to another place, generally speaking with a commercial vehicle known as a recovery vehicle, tow truck or spectacle lift.

Recovery can take the form of general recovery, normally of broken down vehicles, or a statutory recovery at the request of the police using police powers, conferred in the United Kingdom by Parliament using an Act.

== General recovery ==
There are many types of organisations that carry out the recovery of disabled vehicles; however, they can be divided into two distinct areas: Recovery operators (who undertake the recovery) and motoring organisations.

Motoring organisations — or as they are often known, 'The Clubs' — are organisations to which the vehicle's driver will belong. They may have made a conscious effort to do this, or they may have got the membership with their new vehicle, through a company scheme, or purchased with an insurance policy.

In the event that a member of the public does not have a club membership, the police or highways agency can arrange recovery of the vehicle at what is called an owner's request and they will arrange for help to attend.

Recovery operators are the people who undertake the recovery. They are known by different names around the world, including patrols' tow men, and wrecker drivers. Some are the people used by the motoring organisations to rescue their members. A small percentage will be on the payroll of the motoring organisation and will work exclusively for them. Examples are the patrols used by The AA, RAC, and Mondial in the UK. Most recovery operators, however, work for privately owned companies or are individuals. They can do large volumes of work for some of the motoring organisations, but they will normally also do work for the public. In Europe, the percentage of this private work is low due to the high profiles of the motoring organisations. Of course some will never do work for the motoring organisations, preferring to work just for their own customers. In the USA, motoring organisations are still growing.

Although there have always been auto repair shops and garages who towed or recovered any vehicles, it is only really in the last fifty years that vehicle recovery has become an industry distinct from the auto repair trade. Many are still involved in workshop repairs, but an increasing number, if they cannot repair the vehicle by the roadside, will transport it to another repairer. Although there are some large organisations operating hundreds of recovery vehicles, most are family businesses operating typically between 10 and 50 vehicles. Lastly there are operators like highway authorities and other government bodies, operators of local recovery schemes (contra flows, etc.) and large fleet operators who recover their own vehicles.

== Challenges in vehicle recovery ==
Vehicle recovery often involves challenging scenarios that require specialized techniques and equipment, particularly in difficult weather or complex environments like multistorey car parks, steep hills, or off-road areas. Professional recovery operators adapt their methods to these settings, sometimes using compact recovery vehicles or adjustable lifts to maneuver within tight spaces or limited height clearances.

For the driver awaiting assistance, certain preparations can streamline the process and reduce delays. Keeping the vehicle's tow eye or tow hook ready can expedite the recovery setup. It’s also helpful for drivers to inform the recovery operator if the vehicle can roll (i.e., be pushed without engine power), as this determines the type of equipment needed, such as skates or dollies for immobilized vehicles. Additionally, providing precise location details, checking for any height restrictions, and noting any obstacles or mechanical issues (like locked wheels) further aids the recovery operation. These small preparations can make a significant difference in challenging recovery scenarios.

== Military recovery ==
Military vehicle recovery is a type of operation conducted to extricate wheeled and tracked vehicles that have become immobile due to condition of the soil, nature of terrain in general, loss of traction due to an attempt to negotiate an obstacle, having broken down, or from sustaining non-combat or combat damage. Vehicles used in military operations can be hard to extricate from sand, snow, or mud. Vehicle recovery is part of the process known in the United States military as Recovery and Battle Damage Assessment and Repair (BDAR), known by other names in other militaries.

=== Levels of recovery ===
There are three levels of recovery:

1. Self-recovery: recovery of a vehicle by its own crew, using available tools and spare parts (known in the U.S. Army as 'basic issue items (BII)', known in Commonwealth armies as the 'common equipment schedule (CES)'), with troubleshooting procedures in manuals as instructions.
2. Like-recovery: recovery of a vehicle by another vehicle of a similar or heavier weight class. Tracked vehicles are not permitted to tow wheeled vehicles, because it damages their steering.
3. Dedicated recovery: recovery of a vehicle by a specialised armoured recovery vehicle (ARV).

In order to limit reliance on recovery assets such as ARVs (whose availability is limited), these levels of recovery aim to make a vehicle crew as self-sustaining as possible.

=== Approaches ===
Recovery can be performed using manual winches or motor-assisted methods of recovery, using ground or vehicle-mounted recovery equipment (mostly winches and cranes), with the recovery of heavier vehicles such as tanks conducted by armoured wheel and track recovery vehicles (ARVs). During peacetime and in non-combat settings, various recovery vehicles can be used. In combat, under enemy fire, armies typically used armoured recovery vehicles, as the armour protects the crew from small arms fire and gives some protection from artillery and heavier fire.

Vehicle recovery can be performed by the vehicle itself, particularly if it has a powered winch, or by another like vehicle of similar weight and engine power. Many field expedients and improvised approaches for both recovery and repairs have been used by different armed forces since the wide introduction of vehicles into armed force. During the First World War, recovery vehicles tended to be re-purposed tanks. In WWII, while tanks and armoured personnel carriers were still converted into recovery vehicles, specialized, factory-built armoured recovery vehicles were introduced. This includes recovery with the use of the fifth wheel towing device or with Allied Kinetic Energy Recovery Rope (AKERR). AKERR is braided nylon rope which is designed to stretch, which makes AKERR tow ropes better able to pull stuck vehicles out of mud. Special hand and arm signals are used during the vehicle recovery to guide the participants where field of view or line-of-sight are restricted and to make communications feasible in noisy battlefield conditions.

== History ==
The history of the towing and recovery of motor vehicles has closely followed the history of the automobile itself. In its early days, towing was often achieved by attaching a horse to the disabled vehicle and pulling it home. Many of the first automobile repair shops had been bicycle repairers or blacksmiths, and they quickly adapted to recovering their customers' disabled vehicles. To achieve this, specialised recovery vehicles were often built. As automobiles have grown more sophisticated it has become much harder for the average vehicle owner to diagnose and repair a fault. Thus, a huge and specialised vehicle recovery industry has evolved to serve and support them.

Motoring organisations or clubs have been created to sell breakdown coverage to automobile drivers, particularly popular in Europe. Automobile manufacturers will often purchase bulk membership from the motoring organisations, to give away with new vehicle sales. These are usually 'badged' with the manufacturer's name. A large number of these motoring organisations do not operate recovery vehicles of their own, but instead use independent recovery operators as agents. Those clubs that have their own vehicles often also use independent agents to assist with specialist work, or when their own resources are stretched. Police forces also use independent recovery operators to move vehicles, for example after a car accident, when vehicles are illegally parked and when required for examination.

=== UK ===
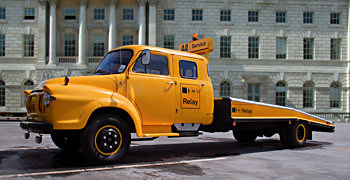
An early AA relay vehicle from around 1973.

Early motorists were often capable of carrying out minor repairs themselves, but as automobiles became more complicated, this became more difficult to carry out successfully. Some early local motoring clubs tried to support their members by encouraging them to help each other. A rota of members who would help other members was kept, and in some cases, cash was put aside to hire a tow vehicle if needed. By the start of the 20th century, some motoring clubs had become large enough to offer roadside assistance service. In the UK, they were The Automobile Association (formed in 1905) and the Royal Automobile Club (formed in 1897 and named Royal in 1907). The services offered were limited to repairs if possible, if not a tow to local garage or the driver's home if nearby (in all cases a limit of 20 miles). During the 1950s, both clubs installed radios to allow them to dispatch patrols straight to the incident. Prior to this, the patrols had needed to go to a patrol box and 'phone in' to see if there were any jobs available.

In 1969 and 1970, a number of Midland-based recovery clubs were formed and started to offer a 'get you home service' from anywhere in the UK. The largest of these was National Breakdown Recovery Club (today known as Green Flag), who also offered to cover you if you had an accident, something almost unheard of up until then. But today scenario is quite different, there are so many entrants into this business. They provide various other services which includes unwanted vehicle removal services, vehicle storage services.

Unlike the AA and RAC, these new clubs did not operate patrols or have their own recovery vehicles. Instead, they recruited recovery operators to work as their agents. These agents were selected from the best garages and coachworks. Inspections of the equipment and facilities were regularly carried out, by the clubs' own inspectors. Within a few years the AA and then the RAC responded with their own get you home or relay services.

=== United States ===
American recovery operators were created to serve the needs of their own customers, rather than of club members as in Europe. Most purchased or built their equipment to tow work into their auto repair shops. Ernest Holmes, one of the older suppliers of recovery equipment, used a line in his advertisements that said "The big profit jobs don't drive in, they are towed in." As in Europe there are some 'recovery only' operators, but nothing like the same percentage as most also operate repair facilities.

== Recovery equipment ==
Modern recovery equipment is extremely sophisticated and manufactured in quantity throughout the world. However up until the mid-seventies a large proportion of the equipment in use was homemade, often just consisting of a ridged jib and a simple block and tackle. After both World Wars, a number of army surplus vehicles were purchased cheaply by operators and converted to civilian use. This was especially true for recovering trucks and other commercial vehicles.

In 1918, Ernest Holmes Sr of Chattanooga, Tennessee patented the first American commercially successful vehicle recovery crane, and its modern descendants have changed little since. Around the same time, recovery cranes were being produced by Weaver Manufacturing and Manley. In Europe, Harvey Frost Ltd of Great Portland Street, London, started selling recovery cranes made by Ernest Lake from around 1905. The first major change to these crane designs would take another fifty years and came from Sweden. Olaf Ekengard, under the trade name EKA, designed and marketed a crane that lifted from underneath the subject vehicle. Nearly all lift and tow vehicles today use variations of his idea, while traditional cranes are kept for specialist work.

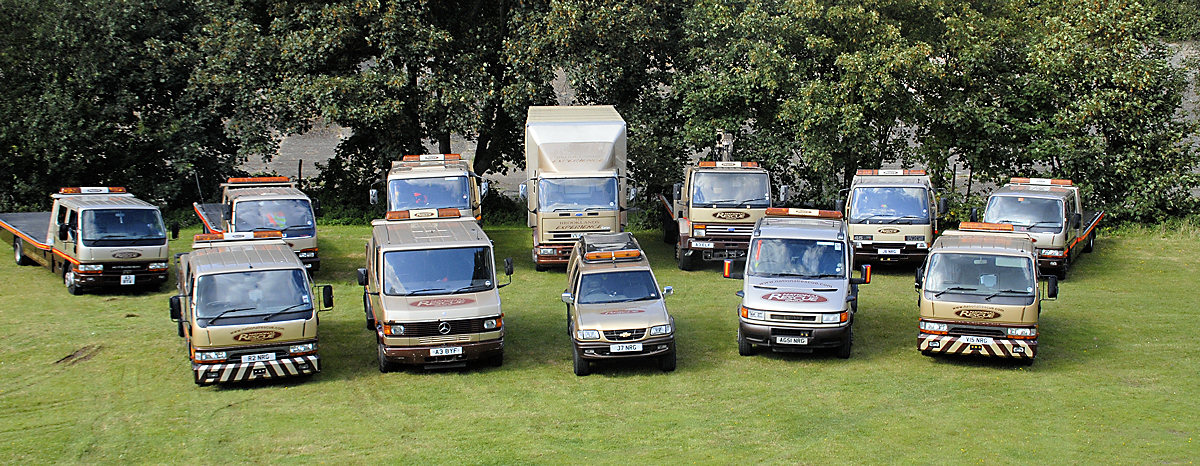
A typical assortment of recovery vehicles

A typical modern recovery fleet will operate a great diversity of different types of recovery and support vehicles. This will include basic service vans, mobile workshops, lift and tow vehicles often called tow trucks, transporters and trailers. It is not uncommon for them to also operate mobile cranes, road going fork lifts, articulated tractor units and incident support vehicles.

In some locations they may also operate off-road vehicles and even boats. All will have specialised vehicle body styles, to best achieve the job they were designed to do.

=== Types of tow ===
There are five main methods of vehicle recovery:

==== Soft ====
Used for very short distances where a rope, chain, or a length of webbing is attached to the casualty, which must have a working braking system as it will be used to slow both vehicles. This can be dangerous, unless both drivers are competent enough to do it. Although many people believe this is illegal on motorways it is not in Europe, as long as the relevant trailer laws are complied with, i.e., correctly configured lights and signing, observing trailer speed limits, etc. In the US this is simply called a "flat tow", and it is not common practice to use the brakes of the rear vehicle to stop both vehicles. As typically a car is being flat towed because the engine won't run, and without a running engine the power brakes don't work, it could be dangerous as well as difficult to slow and stop two vehicles using only the brakes that only half function. Instead, it is typical for the towing vehicle to drive normally, but avoiding sharp acceleration or braking. All the person driving the rear vehicle has to do is gently apply the brakes whenever the tow chain begins to slacken, and anticipate stops so he or she can drag the brakes and come to a halt without excessive slack in the chain. This still requires a relatively skilled driver, as neither the power brakes or power steering will function, and you must take care to steer wide in sharp corners and never allow the chain to slacken, or it may get jerked and broken, or worse, drag underneath the vehicle and possibly cause damage or even loss of control.

==== Rigid (or bar) ====
Used for very short distances where a solid metal bar is attached to the casualty. Used mainly with commercial vehicles, which often have a towing eye in the front bumper. In the case of cars and light vans, the towing vehicle can be used for braking, if the bar is kept straight. With commercial vehicles, it is common to connect an air feed to the casualty to allow the tow vehicle's brakes to also operate the casualty's brakes. In the US, both "soft" and "rigid" tows are called "flat tows", although if a rigid bar is used it may be called a "bar tow".

==== Lift tow (suspend tow crane) ====
Now rarely used, but for many years the only way to move a disabled vehicle without using a low loader or trailer. Chains were attached, usually around the casualty's suspension, and some form of packing (often a seat squab or tyre) was inserted between the lifting frame and the casualty. This frame was lifted by means of a pulley until the casualty’s wheels were clear of the ground. An 'A' frame was normally used to keep the casualty from running into the tow vehicle on braking.

==== Lift (underlift) ====
The lift tow is the most common modern method for short distance transportation. The casualty is winched onto a lifting grid and then raised by lifting the grid, with the casualty’s tires strapped to the grid. The grid is shaped like a large pair of spectacles, which accounts for the common name of this type of vehicle, the speclift or spectacle lift. With commercial vehicles, it is more common to use a set of lifting forks to attach to the suspension, axle or chassis of the casualty. In many cases, e.g., with automatics, it is the 'driven' wheels that need to be lifted. This will sometimes result in a rear lift, if the driven wheels are at the rear. In this case the casualty's steering must be locked in the straight ahead position.

==== Transportation (total lift) ====
The preferred way to travel any distance. Usually the vehicles are purpose-built low-loading 'Transporters' although trailers are still used, especially for the movement of coaches and buses. Some transporter designs are very sophisticated, with bodies that 'demount' to give a low loading angle. This is especially useful for sports cars, etc., with low ground clearance. There are also transporters with totally enclosed bodies, used for example for the transportation of prestige vehicles, or vehicles involved in crime that are going for forensic analyses. In the sites it often common to see 'city loaders,' a type of transporter fitted with a cradle to totally suspend a vehicle for loading. These are often used to move illegally parked vehicles.

==== Variations ====
For a long while, it was common to use 'dollies' to recover vehicles. These were cranes and underlifts as above, but mounted on a two-wheeled axle. They were designed to be towed behind a suitable towing vehicle. Another portable device was a crane, which clipped on to an articulated tractor unit's fifth wheel coupling. Popular in the seventies and eighties, they were cheap to buy (compared with a purpose-built recovery vehicle) and appealed to fleet operators, who could use them to recover their own vehicles. Total lift dollies were carried by some spectacle lifts to place under the wheels at the opposite end to the lifted wheels, thereby converting the half lift into a total lift. These are used, for example, when a vehicle has had an accident and both ends are damaged.

==== Other equipment ====
Modern recovery vehicles come with a bewildering number of accessories. These include power units to supply air for power tools or pumping off vehicle braking systems, etc. Generators supply 110 or 220 volt mains power for floodlighting, tools, etc. There are different shaped forks for attaching to lift points, or for modifying standard lifting devices to allow them to transport motorbikes. Most vehicles will be equipped with an assortment of lifting strops or chains and webbing to secure loads. A special form of webbing called a snatch strap is sometimes carried to assist with vehicles that are bogged down in mud, etc.

Nearly all vehicles will be fitted with 12 or 24 volt 'jump start' or 'booster' sockets to start other vehicles with discharged batteries. Most will also have power winches to load the casualty, or for dislodging stuck vehicles. Some larger recovery vehicles will have two (or more) winches capable of pulling up to 30 tons per line. These will be used to winch back vehicles that have left the roadway.

Some vehicles are fitted with luxurious multi-seat passenger compartments called crewcabs. These often have DVD players and even drink machines, for the benefit of the casualty's occupants on their trip home. Different types of rotatable cranes are sometimes fitted for lifting vehicles out of ditches, etc. Heavy lifting cranes are sometimes fitted and can be used for example to winch overturned vehicles back on their wheels.

Some recovery vehicles are equipped as mobile workshops or service vans. They will carry a large selection of tools, spares and garage equipment, such as jacks and vehicle stands. In recent years many have also been equipped with spectacle lifts that fold away inside the rear doors. The advantage of this system is if the vehicle is not repairable, it can still be recovered without sending a second vehicle.

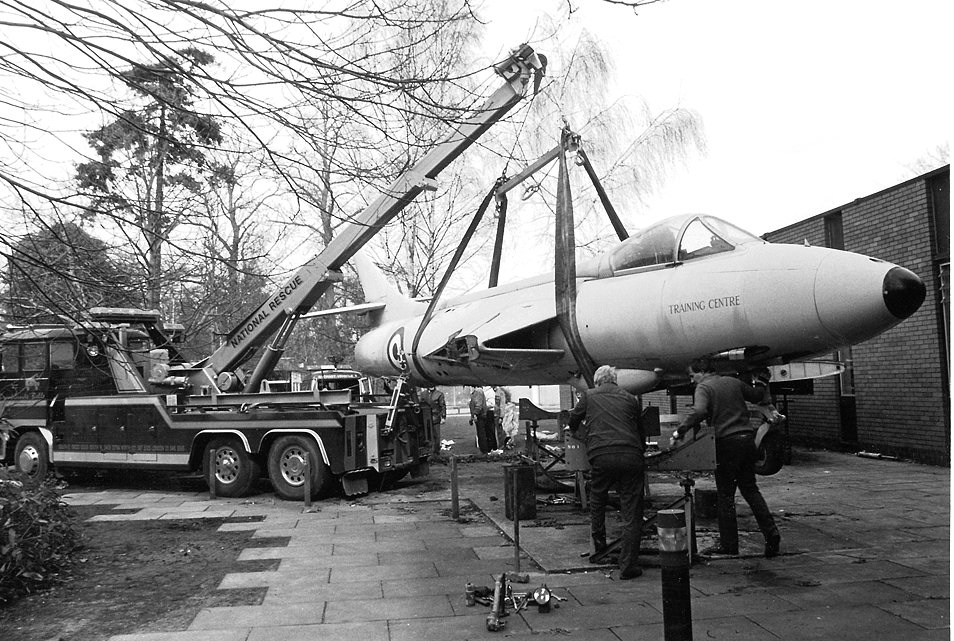

'Righting' an overturned vehicle, especially one that is not badly damaged, has become a science. When a commercial vehicle ends up on its side there will often be little clearance to slide lifting strops underneath it. Even if this can be done, the use of strops can cause further damage and are often not the right way to start a lift. To solve this problem, recovery operators often use air bags to at least start the lift of the casualty. A number of bags can be used and this spreads the load throughout the length of the vehicle. Only a low pressure is used, which means in the event a bag is punctured, it just gently deflates and does not explode. Once the casualty is above 45 degrees, a normal winch can be used to finish the job.

It is not uncommon to use a second winch from the opposite side, to gently lower the casualty once it has passed the point of balance. It is also quite common for recovery operators to be asked to move 'other' items. The picture at right, taken in the late eighties, shows a recovery crane lifting a Hawker Hunter aircraft before transporting it to Brooklands Museum in Weybridge, England.

== Stolen vehicles ==
Stolen vehicles found by the police require recovery services.

Stolen vehicles that are recovered are examined by the police for the investigation and then towed to the insurance company's designated tow yard. The insurance company then contacts a certified crime scene inspection and decontamination expert to complete a Bio Safe. Created by a Canadian firm in 1997, Bio Solutions, the Bio Safe is a specialized inspection and decontamination service which must be performed to act accordingly with all government workplace standards to protect all employees involved in this crime scene from exposure to bio hazardous and hazardous material. It is estimated that over 35% of stolen recovered vehicles contain hazards such as illegal drugs or contaminated paraphernalia such as used needles or crack pipes, semen and sputum. Aside from a dry and warmer place to sleep for homeless people, these vehicles are often used for illegal activity such as prostitution, storage of and selling illegal material such as drugs or weapons.

In the early days of vehicle recovery, the driver of an automobile would have to contact his or her club or local garage in some way when it failed. Telephones were supplied for this purpose by some motoring organisations, and eventually the agencies responsible for the major roads networks would install them on some hard shoulders. Club patrols would also use the club's phone to check in for work, or wait at their depot for the calls to come in. In the fifties as mobile radios became more reliable, most clubs and some garages fitted them to their vehicles. This had a dramatic effect on ETAs as it was now often possible to divert a returning recovery vehicle before it got back.

To achieve the best use of their assets, all motoring organisations have invested heavily in Information Technology. Computer software is used to distribute work based on criteria such as nearest vehicle, right equipment (or spares) carried, and of course driver hours regulations. The vehicles are usually fitted with GPS tracking devices, which transmit the vehicle’s current location. Motoring organisation vehicles are also fitted with a Mobile Data Terminal, allowing job details to be sent direct to the driver.

Most recovery operators have also invested in IT. Most have job logging software and many have installed in-vehicle communication devices and GPS tracking devices. The distribution of work to the fleet is a very skilful job and the person doing it is often under intense strain. They are known as dispatchers in the USA and controllers in the UK. Because operators are expected to take calls 24 hours a day, some smaller ones pass their telephones to message services after hours.

Uniquely in the UK and Ireland the motoring organisations and the recovery operators have worked together to form a common standard for the communication of job details. The system is called Turbo Dispatch and was introduced in 1995. It uses a combination of Mobitex data radios and the Internet to communicate. Its main advantage is that it does away with the need for the information to be re-keyed into all the different computers in use and eliminates most of the delays associated with 'job taking'. If the information is put in correctly at the start, it will still be correct when the invoice is raised.

It was estimated at the European Tow Show in 2005 that 90% of all jobs dealt with by independent UK recovery operators are passed using the Turbo Dispatch system. The system allows a broken-down motorist to pass his details to the motoring organisation (usually by phone), but once they have entered his information into their computer, it can then be sent electronically to their agents. Apart from speed and accuracy, another advantage is that the message can have the casualty's grid coordinates built into it. This then allows the operator to rebroadcast it to the recovery vehicle, where the onboard satellite navigation system can guide the driver to the incident, even if he does not know the area. The same system is also used to tell the motoring organisation when the recovery vehicle is on scene, when it is clear and what the outcome was.

== Regulation ==
The towing and salvage industry can often be heavily regulated, particularly the part of industry involved in this sort of work following road accidents. The regulation can involve limitations on the numbers of vehicles able to operate in particular areas, particularly major cities, typically through licensing and post accident allocation schemes. Controls have been imposed in States in Australia, for example, in an attempt to avoid too many tow trucks attending road accident scenes and the potential for disputes arising among drivers seeking the same towing work. The regulation can also extend to probity controls on industry participants. An example of this sort of scheme is to be found in the Accident Towing Services Act enacted by the State of Victoria, Australia.

== See also ==
- Towing
- Vehicle recovery (military)

== Bibliography ==
- Wreck and Recovery, Alan Thomas, 1987 Patrick Stephens Ltd.
- Vehicle Recovery, Ron Grice, 1977 Newnes Butterworths Ltd.
- We the Professionals I, II, III all, Bill Jackson, 1983-1989 Wreckers International Ltd.
- The World History of the Towing and Recovery Industry, John Hawkins, TT Publications Inc.
- The Motoring Century (the story of the RAC), Piers Brendon, 1997 Bloomsbury Publishing Plc
- Breakdown Doctor, Fred Henderson, 2005, Reading Room Publishing.
- A History of Recovery Vehicles in the British Army, Brian S Baxtor, 198 HMSO
- Wreckers and Recovery Vehicles, Bart H Vanderveen, 1972, Haynes Publishing Group
- Wreckers and Tow Trucks, Donald Wood, 1995, Motorbooks International
- "Recovery and Battle Damage Assessment and Repair (BDAR) – ATP 4-31/MCRP 3-40E.1" (PDF). armypubs.army.mil. United States Department of the Army. 18 November 2020. Archived from the original (PDF) on September 24, 2022.
