= Velocita Wireless =

National wireless-telecommunications service provider

Velocita Wireless, LLC
- Formerly: RAM Mobile Data; BellSouth Wireless Data; Cingular Interactive, L.P.
- Type: Subsidiary
- Industry: Telecommunications
- Predecessor: Cingular Wireless (Mobitex division)
- Founded: 2004 (as Velocita)
- Headquarters: Woodbridge, United States
- Products: Mobitex wireless data services
- Services: M2M telemetry; Smart grid solutions; automatic vehicle location; point-of-sale transactions
- Owner: United Wireless Holdings, Inc.
- Parent: United Wireless
- Website: www.velocitawireless.com

Velocita Wireless is a national Wireless-telecommunications service provider that is based in Woodbridge Township, New Jersey. Known by several names over the years, Velocita Wireless has been in existence for over 17 years as the operator of the Mobitex network in the United States. Previously known as Cingular Interactive, L.P., BellSouth Wireless Data and prior to that RAM Mobile Data, Velocita Wireless carved a market for itself with the acquisition of the Mobitex network from Cingular and rebranding itself overall as Velocita in 2004.

== History ==
In 2001, the company's Mobitex network proved to be effective in communications in Manhattan during the September 11, 2001 terrorist attacks. Most other cellular and wireless telecommunications services were knocked-out or overloaded in New York City. The effectiveness of the network led to Velocita developing a small 'following' amongst emergency responders in the United States.

In 2006, Velocita Wireless became a strategic buyout for the Sprint Nextel Corporation. Based in the Commonwealth of Virginia, Sprint was overcoming various shortcomings of the NEXTEL Communications Integrated Digital Enhanced Network (iDEN) which it acquired in 2005. The spectrum holdings of Velocita were intended to supplement Nextel's frequencies in the 900 MHz band and help relieve expected congestion in its network's 800 MHz band.

On July 2, 2007 Velocita Wireless was bought by United Wireless.

In 2010, Velocita Wireless emerged from internal restructuring to focus its narrow-band nationwide wireless data networks on machine-to-machine telemetry solutions for Point-of-Sale credit card transactions, utility/energy smart grid applications, automatic vehicle location (AVL), home and business security, and wireless vending.
