= Martin Long (businessman) =

English businessman (born 1950)

Martin Long (born 26 August 1950) is a businessman and founder of Churchill Insurance.

== Career ==
Long began his career working in a number of insurance companies. He went on to become managing director of Halifax Insurance.

Together with Peter Wood, he founded Direct Line in 1985, the first telephone-only insurance company in the UK. Four years later, Long broke away to form Churchill Insurance, a company he would manage himself until its purchase by the Royal Bank of Scotland in 2003, a deal that is said to have earned Long £50 million. He retained his job of running Churchill until 2004, when he left to set up his own property company.

Long was also one of the owners of Crystal Palace Football Club, holding 25% of the club's shares. After American investors Josh Harris and David Blitzer made a deal with Crystal Palace F.C., Long now holds 2.5% with the Americans and Steve Parish being the majority share holders.
