= Devitt Insurance =

English insurance broker

Devitt Insurance Services Limited
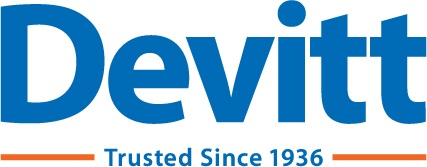
- Type: Privately owned
- Industry: Financial services
- Founded: 1936
- Founder: Howson Foulger Devitt
- Headquarters: Romford, United Kingdom
- Key people: William Hughes (Managing Director); Tony Chapman (Financial Director)
- Products: Insurance
- Number of employees: 130 (2024)
- Website: www.devittinsurance.com

Devitt Insurance Services is a British privately owned insurance broker based in Romford, England founded in 1936. As of 2024, Devitt had circa 130,000 customers, and employed around 130 staff.

Devitt is an insurance broker specialising in vehicle insurance for cars, vans and motorcycles, but also arranges home insurance and business insurance.

They compare quotes from a panel of underwriters, which includes Ageas, Aviva, KGM, LV and Sabre.

== History ==
Devitt's roots began with Thomas Henry Devitt who founded Devitt and Moore in 1836. His grandson Howson Foulger Devitt formed the company that would eventually become Devitt Insurance Services.

In 1936, the Devitt 'DU' motorcycle was launched. It was an innovative idea to sell motorcycle insurance through motorcycle dealers. It allowed customers to ride away from the dealers on their motorcycle on the same day. The scheme was launched in conjunction with "H.P." Motor Policies at Lloyd's.

Devitt 'DU' changes to Devitt 'DA' (Dealers Association) in 1955 and made a massive impact on marketing campaigns for years to come.

1965 saw the creation of Devitt Langton & Dawnay Day Ltd, formed as a holding company for the Devitt broking interests. This meant a shareholding in Langton Underwriting Agencies at Lloyd's and backed by Dawnay Day, a small merchant bank.

The holding company established in 1965 changed its name to Devitt Group Ltd in 1979, due to the expansion of the Devitt broking operations, the sale of the Langton interests and the demise of Dawnay Day.

Steel Burrill Jones Group plc (SBJ) purchased Devitt Group Ltd in 1989.

In 1990, Devitt Insurance Services Ltd was formed, merging the personal lines and affinity group business which had been developed within the Devitt Group Ltd by its subsidiary companies; Howson F Devitt & Sons Ltd, Devitt DA and Double Cox Tyrie.

Churchill acquired Devitt Insurance Services in 1999.

In 2003, Royal Bank of Scotland bought Churchill group, including Devitt, for £1.1 billion.

Keep Britain Biking (KBB) is an online biking community site launched in 2010 and sponsored by Devitt Insurance.

Devitt Insurance completed a management buy-out in 2011 and was owned by William Hughes (Managing Director) and Tony Chapman (Finance Director). Following this, Devitt bought Screentrade from Lloyds TSB. Devitt were arranging car insurance for Screentrade whilst they were both owned by Lloyds. Screentrade was one of the first online insurance/brokers comparison sites.

2016 marked the 80th anniversary of Devitt arranging motorcycle insurance for UK bikers.

In 2017, Devitt sponsored the "As Seen From The Sidecar" team who circumnavigated the globe in 18 months raising awareness on modern slavery in their Honda scooter and sidecar.

In 2018 Devitt worked with road safety charity Brake to sponsor their Road Safety Week campaign.

In February 2022, Devitt was purchased by Gallagher for an undisclosed sum. William Hughes and Tony Chapman, who oversaw the management buyout from the Royal Bank of Scotland in 2011, have remained with the business.

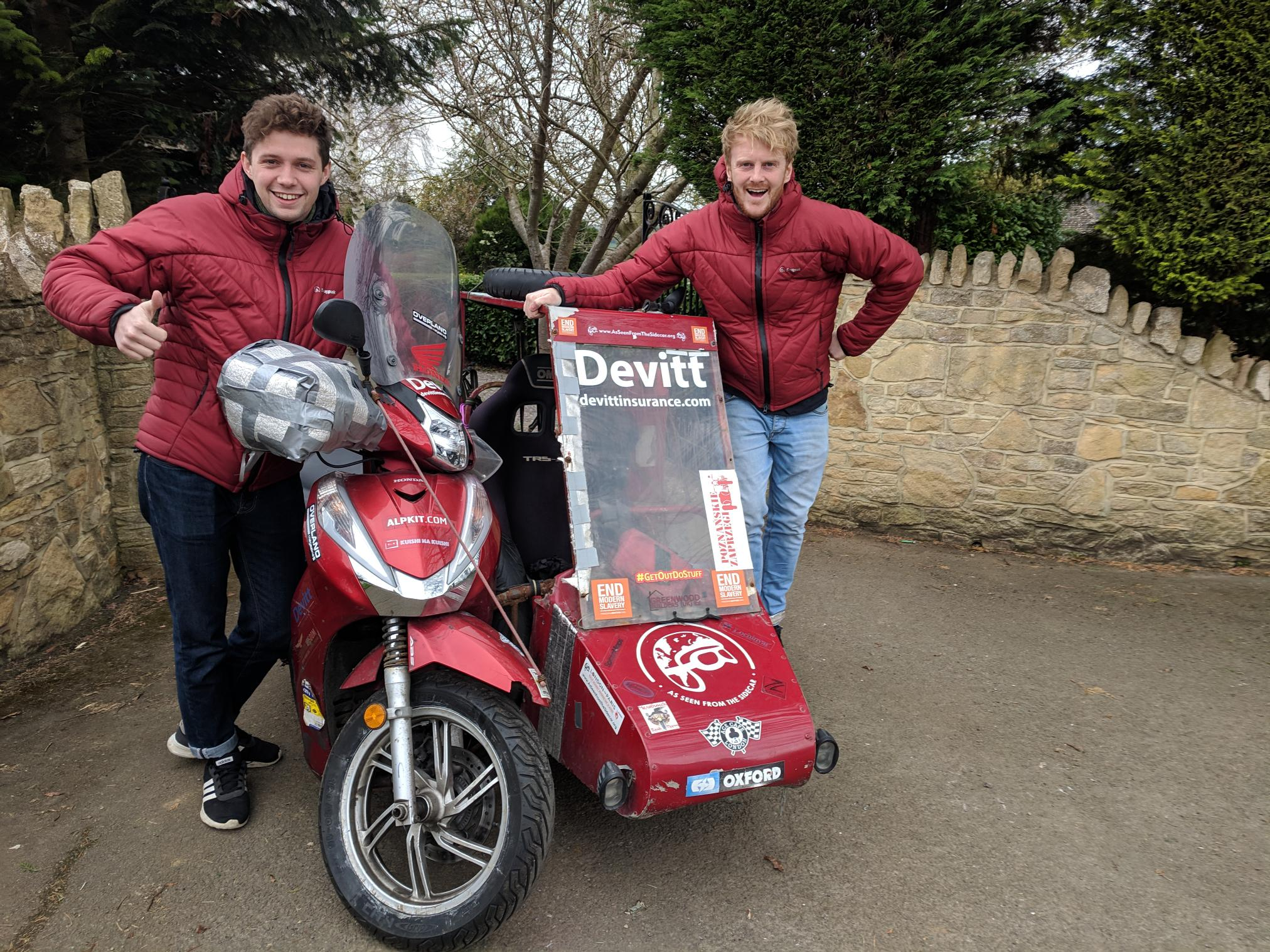
As Seen From The Sidecar

Gordon Stuart, also known as "The Arctic Rider", has been sponsored by Devitt since 2014 Stuart holds fundraising rides on his motorbike to raise money for charity, including riding the Arctic Circle in 2014, Iron Butt Challenge in 2016 and a Dalton Highway challenge in summer 2018.

Other brands include Screentrade, which arranges car, van and motorbike insurance.

With offices in Romford and Ipswich, Devitt has around 130 members of staff.
