= Penny James =

British businesswoman (born 1969)

- Born: 27 September 1969 (age 55)
- Alma mater: University of Bath; Millfield
- Occupation: Chief executive officer (2019–2023)
- Employer: Admiral Group (2015–2017); Allied Dunbar; Direct Line Group (2017–2023); Prudential plc (2011–2017); PwC (1991–1994)
- Children: 1

Penny James (born 27 September 1969) is a British businesswoman who was the chief executive of Direct Line Group from May 2019 to January 2023.

== Career ==
James worked at Omega Insurance and Zürich before joining Prudential Plc, where her roles have included chief risk officer. She also was a non-executive director of Admiral Group between 2015 and 2017.

In 2017, she left Prudential to join the Direct Line Group (DLG) as chief financial officer. At the time, she was the only woman on the executive committee of DLG. In May 2019, James succeeded Paul Geddes as CEO of DLG. In January 2023, she stepped down and was succeeded by chief commercial officer Jonathan Greenwood as acting chief executive.

== Personal life ==
James attended several schools including the Worcester Girls' Grammar School, Croydon High School, and Millfield, due to frequent transfers in her father's job. She graduated from the University of Bath with a degree in statistics. She is married with one daughter and lives in Hampshire.
