= Peter Wood (businessman) =

English entrepreneur (born 1946)

Sir Peter John Wood CBE (born 6 November 1946, in Surrey) is an English entrepreneur, most notable as the founder of the Direct Line and esure insurance companies. Wood was appointed Commander of the Order of the British Empire (CBE) in the 1996 New Year Honours for services to the insurance industry, and knighted in the 2016 Birthday Honours for services to UK industry and philanthropy. In 2021 he was the 198th wealthiest person in Britain with an estimated personal fortune of £815 million, according to the Sunday Times Rich List 2021.

== Personal life ==
Wood was born on 6 November 1946 in Kingston, Surrey. He was educated at Brooklands College in Weybridge. He is divorced and has five daughters.

== Career ==
=== Direct Line ===
In 1985 Wood launched Direct Line, the first telephone-only insurance company in the UK. The venture was underwritten by the Royal Bank of Scotland, and within nine years was the biggest insurer of private vehicles in the country, claiming three times as many customers as the Royal Bank itself. Wood did not have a capital stake in Direct Line, having sold it to the Royal Bank in 1988 in return for considerable performance-related remuneration. This led to his becoming Britain's highest paid company director, receiving £1.6 million in 1991, £6 million in 1992, and £18.2 million in 1993. The subsequent attention and notoriety his pay attracted—Labour Party MP and then-shadow Trade Secretary Robin Cook called his bonus "obscene"—was a source of embarrassment both to Wood himself and the Royal Bank, which attempted to buy its way out of its contractual obligations with a one-off £24 million payment in 1994, taking his total income that year to £42 million. Wood himself claims that he personally requested an end to the deal after receiving a letter bomb at the Direct Line offices which injured a member of staff. Nevertheless, Wood remained richly rewarded, receiving another £17 million in 1995 and remaining a byword for the perceived excesses of corporate boardrooms in the 1990s, according to critics.

He left Direct Line in 1997, but continued to work with the Royal Bank in other areas, including Privilege, an insurance company specialising in lower-risk customers which had been founded in 1996. Whilst running Direct Line, Wood founded Línea Directa Aseguradora (LDA), a direct motor insurer in Spain, through a joint venture between RBS and Bankinter. LDA listed on the Madrid stock exchange in April 2020 with a market valuation of €1.434bn euros.

=== esure ===
In 1999 Wood founded esure, this time in partnership with the Halifax bank, which provided £150 million of startup capital. esure used the same business model as Direct Line and targeted the same customer base, establishing a foothold in the market before following with a subsidiary (First Alternative) in 2003 for drivers of higher premium vehicles. Even its advertising and marketing were similar, to the point where Direct Line challenged esure's "Mr Mouse" character to be an infringement of its own iconic red telephone on wheels, and it successfully took esure to court to prevent it being trademarked. A women-only specialist insurance brand, Sheilas' Wheels, was established by Wood and esure in October 2005.

In February 2010, Wood led a management buy-out of esure, subsequently leading the floatation of esure Group plc on the London Stock Exchange on 27 March 2013. esure staff received a £3m payout at the time. In August 2018, esure announced that it was to be acquired by Bain Capital for £1.2bn. Wood remained as Chairman of esure until March 2020 when he stepped down from the Board.

=== GoCo Group ===
Sir Peter Wood was also chairman of price comparison website Gocompare.com, following its demerger from esure Group plc in November 2016. In November 2020, Future plc agreed a £594 million takeover of GoCo Group plc, which by this point had grown to include not just Gocompare.com but also Look After My Bills and MyVoucherCodes.

=== Other ===
Wood also set up two insurance companies in the United States, Response (1995) and Homesite (1997), although his involvement with both of them came to an end in 2004. He is a Director and shareholder in American insurer The Plymouth Rock Company.

From 1996 to 2000, Wood was a non-executive director of the holding company British Gas and the Automobile Association. In 1998, he was appointed as a non-executive director to the Board of the Economist, where he serviced until March 2004.

Wood is an established investor in property. Developments include the former headquarters of BBC Radio in Marylebone, London and properties in Palm Beach, Florida.

In 2021, Wood founded the investment vehicle, SPWOne.

== Philanthropy ==
He was appointed a director of the Princess Royal Trust for Carers in 1994 and served for three years until he moved to found The Croydon Colorectal Cancer Charity with Mr Ian Swift, Consultant Surgeon at Mayday Hospital, Surrey.

Wood is the biggest donor to prostate cancer research at UCL Hospital in London, where he has funded the latest radiology equipment and sponsors a leading professor. Wood also funded equipment enabling UCL to conduct research in the immune response detectable from the blood of Covid-19 patients.

In 2024, Wood donated £500,000 to the Conservative Party.
