= RAM Mobile Data =

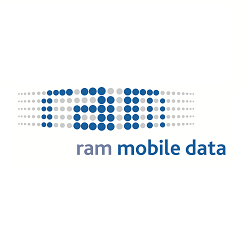
- Type: Private
- Industry: Wireless, ICT, fleet management
- Founded: 1988
- Headquarters: Utrecht, The Netherlands
- Products: Mobitex, paging, interactive messaging, tracking and tracing, ICT services
- Revenue: N/A
- Number of employees: 120
- Website: www.ram.nl

RAM Mobile Data was founded by RAM Broadcasting Corporation as American Mobile Data Communications, Inc. in 1988. The name of the company was changed to Ram Mobile Data in 1989. RAM Mobile Data was the U.S. Operator of the Mobitex network.

RAM Mobile Data was sold and renamed BellSouth Wireless Data in 1995 and later became Cingular Interactive when BellSouth and SBC Communications formed Cingular Wireless. The Mobitex division within Cingular Wireless was sold to an investment company in 2005 and became Velocita Wireless. Velocita Wireless was purchased by Sprint Nextel and became a Sprint Nextel Company in early 2006. Today RAM Mobile Data is the exclusive operator of Mobitex in the Netherlands. With headquarters in Utrecht (NL) and a daughter in Brussels (BE), they are running the entire Mobitex operations throughout the BeNeLux. Furthermore, RAM has a business unit RAM track-and-trace and since 2010 a daughter in IT services Ram Infotechnology.

Navara was a division of RAM Mobile Data until 2013, and provides mobile device interface solutions for existing applications and databases. Nowadays Navara is privatized and operates from Driebergen.

The Mobitex in the BeNeLux was sold in 2018 to Entropia.
