= Esure =

English online insurance company

Esure Group plc
- ISIN: GB00B8KJH563
- Industry: Insurance
- Founded: 2000; 26 years ago
- Founder: Peter Wood
- Headquarters: Reigate, England, UK
- Key people: Andy Haste (chairman)
- Revenue: £ 781.3 million (2017)
- Operating income: £ 98.6 million (2017)
- Net income: £ 80.4 million (2017)
- Parent: Ageas
- Website: www.esure.com

Esure Group plc (stylised as esure) is an Internet and telephone based insurance company based in Reigate, England. It also has offices in Manchester and Glasgow.

== History ==
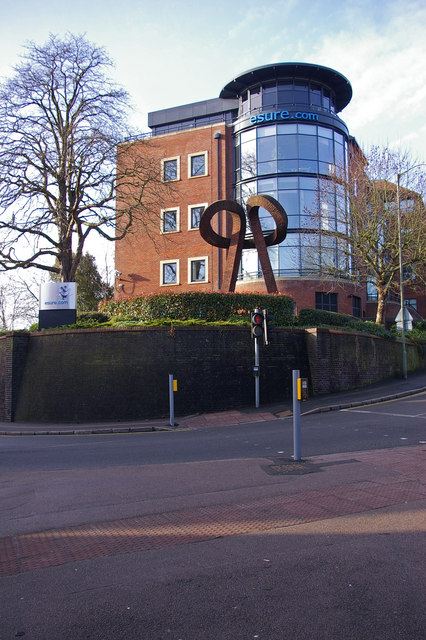
Premises in Reigate, Surrey

Esure was founded in 2000 by businessman Peter Wood, who also launched the Direct Line insurance company for the Royal Bank of Scotland.

Esure is also known for its high-profile commercials with Michael Winner, used from 2002 to 2005 and resuming in 2007. The adverts spawned the phrase, "Calm down dear, it's a commercial".

In 2007, it was announced that Esure would replace E.ON as the sponsor of ITV National Weather bulletins. The two-year deal, rumoured to be worth £10 million, was negotiated by Carat Sponsorship and began on 1 January 2008.

On 11 February 2010, Lloyds Banking Group sold its 70% stake in the firm to a company led by Wood, Esure Group Holdings, in a deal valued at £185 million. On December 8, 2014, Esure announced that it was acquiring the remaining 50% of shares in financial comparison website Gocompare.com having previously secured a non-controlling stake in the company.

In August 2018, two years after demerging Gocompare.com again, it agreed to be acquired by Bain Capital; the takeover was sanctioned by the High Court in December. This transaction ends a five-year period in which Esure was listed on the London Stock Exchange.

In April 2025, five years after Andy Haste replaced Wood as chairman of Esure, it was announced that Bain Capital had agreed to sell the company for €1.510bn to Ageas. On 30 September, it was announced that the transaction had been completed.

== Operations ==
Esure offers motor insurance, home insurance and travel insurance. The company focuses on lower risk customers, offering cheaper premiums for customers with a current no claims bonus for its car insurance products. Esure car insurance also incorporates the First Alternative brand which in the past offered quotes to higher risk customers as a separately authorised insurer but now sits as a small-scale sub-brand of Esure.

== Criticism and concerns ==
Concerns were raised in 2013 about potential conflict of interest. Esure's Peter Wood donated tens of thousands to the Conservatives and Esure's initial public offering (IPO) of February 2013 highlighted that insurance-company-friendly legislation of 2012 offered Esure expansion potential. "Quite evidently, Esure itself thought it was benefitting from the changes under new laws, as did Peter Wood personally, who made some £198 Million from the flotation"; about a third of his shares.

In October 2014, Esure faced criticism after it declined an insurance claim and offered only a ‘goodwill payment’ of £5,000 on behalf of a policy holder whose abusive husband had set fire to her home. The husband pleaded guilty to effectively torturing his wife with an axe over a period of three days, and the non-payment of the policy left the victim homeless. In a statement, Esure said they had "utmost sympathy for the horrific incident" but added that insurance was there to cover "unexpected events and accidents, not deliberate and unlawful acts by individuals destroying their property".

Concerns were raised in 2014 about potential conflicts of interest when insurance companies own insurance comparison sites. Financial Conduct Authority (FCA) regulations says such potential conflicts of interest must be 'flagged up'. An FCA report said "Small print on the Gocompare.com website informs customers that it is 50% owned by Esure" (Esure owned 100% of GoCompare as of December 2014). However, "the FCA found no evidence that such firms had profited as a result of their potentially conflicting ownership."
