= Direct Line =

British insurance company

- Trade name: Direct Line
- Industry: Insurance
- Founder: Martin Long; Peter Wood
- Headquarters: Bromley, England
- Products: Vehicle insurance, Home insurance, Pet insurance, Life insurance, Travel insurance, Business insurance
- Brands: Direct Line for Business
- Owner: Aviva
- Number of employees: <10,000
- Parent: Direct Line Group
- Website: www.directline.com

Direct Line is an insurance company based in Bromley, England. Founded in 1985, as the country's first direct car insurance company, it has since expanded to offer a range of general insurance products. Its policies are underwritten by the regulated subsidiary UK Insurance Limited, and it is owned by the Direct Line Group.

== History ==
It was founded in Croydon by Martin Long and Peter Wood in 1985 as the insurance division of Royal Bank of Scotland.

In 1988, it started to sell home insurance. Direct Line is renowned for having transformed financial services in the United Kingdom.

The mascot had altered slightly over the years; being accompanied by a red mouse on wheels to represent the company's website in 2005, which was dropped in 2020, with another re brand leaving the phone on its own once more. In September 2014, the brand worked with Saatchi and Saatchi to relaunch its advertising, which saw Hollywood actor Harvey Keitel reprise his role as the character Winston Wolfe from the 1994 film Pulp Fiction. The company had one million customers after eight years by June 2003.

The innovations extended into the 2000s with the launch of the first online claims registration and tracking facility in the United Kingdom for its motor insurance customers in 2001, and Home Response 24 Emergency Insurance, launching in 2003.

In December 2024, Direct Line launched three motor insurance products on the price comparison website which are available on Compare the Market.

== Controversy ==
In January 2012, Direct Line, along with sister company Churchill Insurance, was fined £2.17m by the FSA, after being found guilty of altering complaints files.

== Awards ==
Direct Line has won a number of awards including:

- Financial Services Forum Awards 2016: Advertising; Customer Experience; Customer Loyalty and Retention, Judges' Special Award for Marketing Excellence.
- YourMoney.com Awards 2016: Direct Winners – Best Direct Car Insurance Provider
- Your Money Awards 2015: Direct Winners – Best Direct Car Insurance Provider

== Rebranding ==
In Italy and Germany, Direct Line was acquired by MAPFRE Group in September 2014, and re branded to Verti in January 2017. Verti is a brand owned by MAPFRE Group, operating in Italy, Germany, Spain and the United States.
