= Docomo PRIME series N-04B =

Mobile phone

docomo PRIME series N-04B
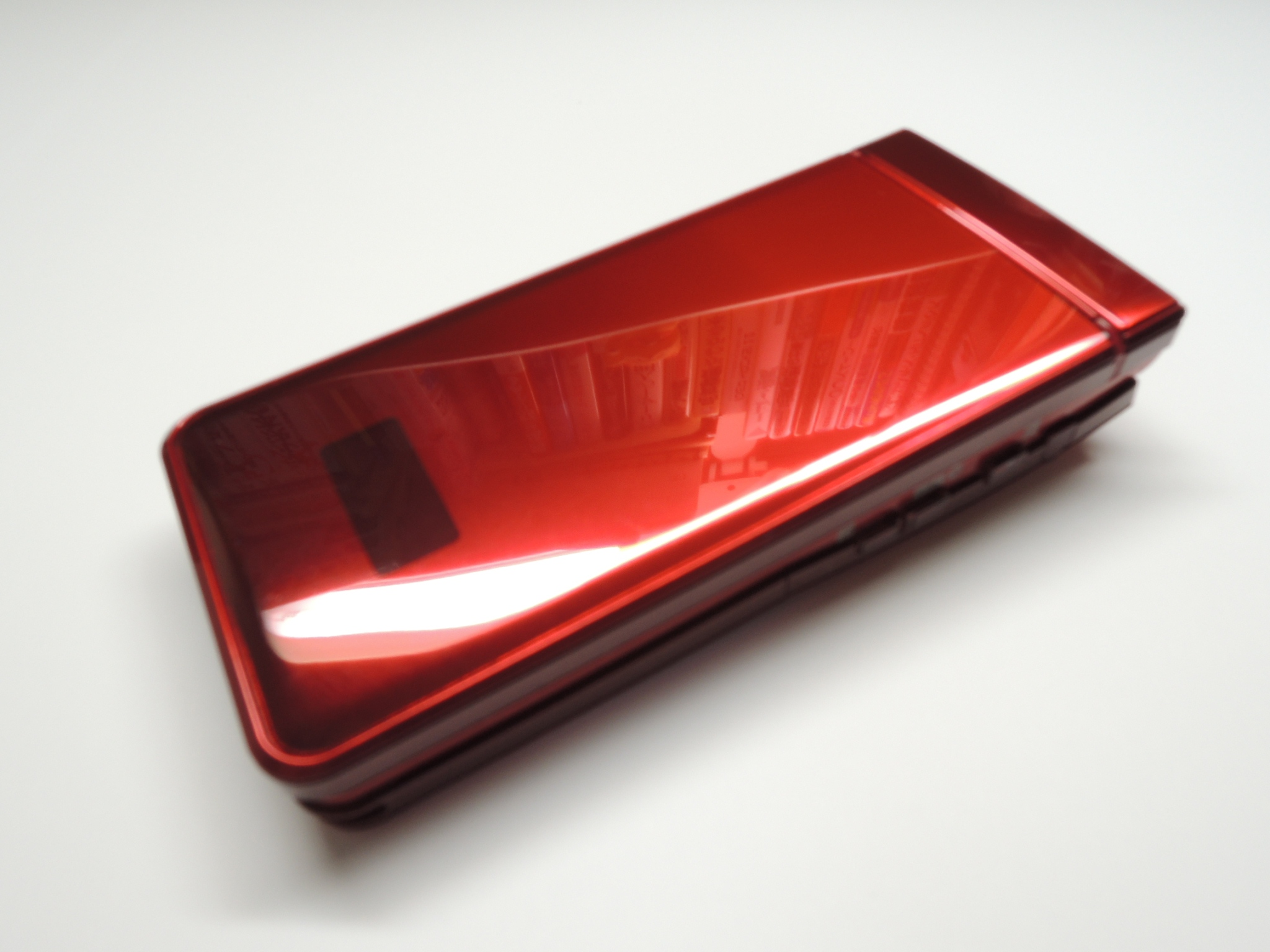
- Brand: NTT Docomo
- Manufacturer: NEC Casio Mobile Communications
- Series: docomo PRIME series
- First released: May 27, 2010; 16 years ago
- Predecessor: N-02B
- Compatible networks: 3G: FOMA (W-CDMA, HSDPA/HSUPA); 2G: GSM; Wi-Fi (IEEE 802.11b/g)
- Form factor: Clamshell (2-axis swivel)
- Colors: WHITE Motion; BLACK Motion; RED Motion
- Dimensions: 113 mm (4.4 in) H 50 mm (2.0 in) W 15.9 mm (0.63 in) D
- Weight: 135 g (4.8 oz)
- Operating system: Access Linux Platform + OPP(L)
- System-on-chip: Texas Instruments
- CPU: OMAP 3430
- Removable storage: microSD (up to 2 GB), microSDHC (up to 16 GB)
- Rear camera: 12.2 megapixel CMOS, 28mm wide-angle lens, autofocus, HD video recording, LED flash, image stabilization, face detection
- Front camera: 0.33 megapixel CMOS
- Display: Main: 3.3 in (84 mm) TFT LCD, 480 × 854 pixels (Full Wide VGA), 16,777,216 colors Sub: 0.8 in (20 mm) OLED, 96 × 35 pixels, 1 color

The docomo PRIME series N-04B is a 3G FOMA mobile phone handset developed by NEC Casio Mobile Communications for NTT Docomo. It is part of the docomo PRIME series.

== History ==
On May 18, 2010, NTT Docomo announced the development and upcoming release of several devices, including the N-04B alongside the F-06B, F-07B, F-08B, L-04B, N-05B, N-06B, N-07B, N-08B, P-04B, P-05B, P-06B, P-07B, SH-02B marimekko, SH-07B, SH-08B, SH-09B, LYNX SH-10B, dynapocket T-01B, and BlackBerry Bold 9700. The device was officially released on May 27, 2010.

== Specifications ==
=== Hardware ===
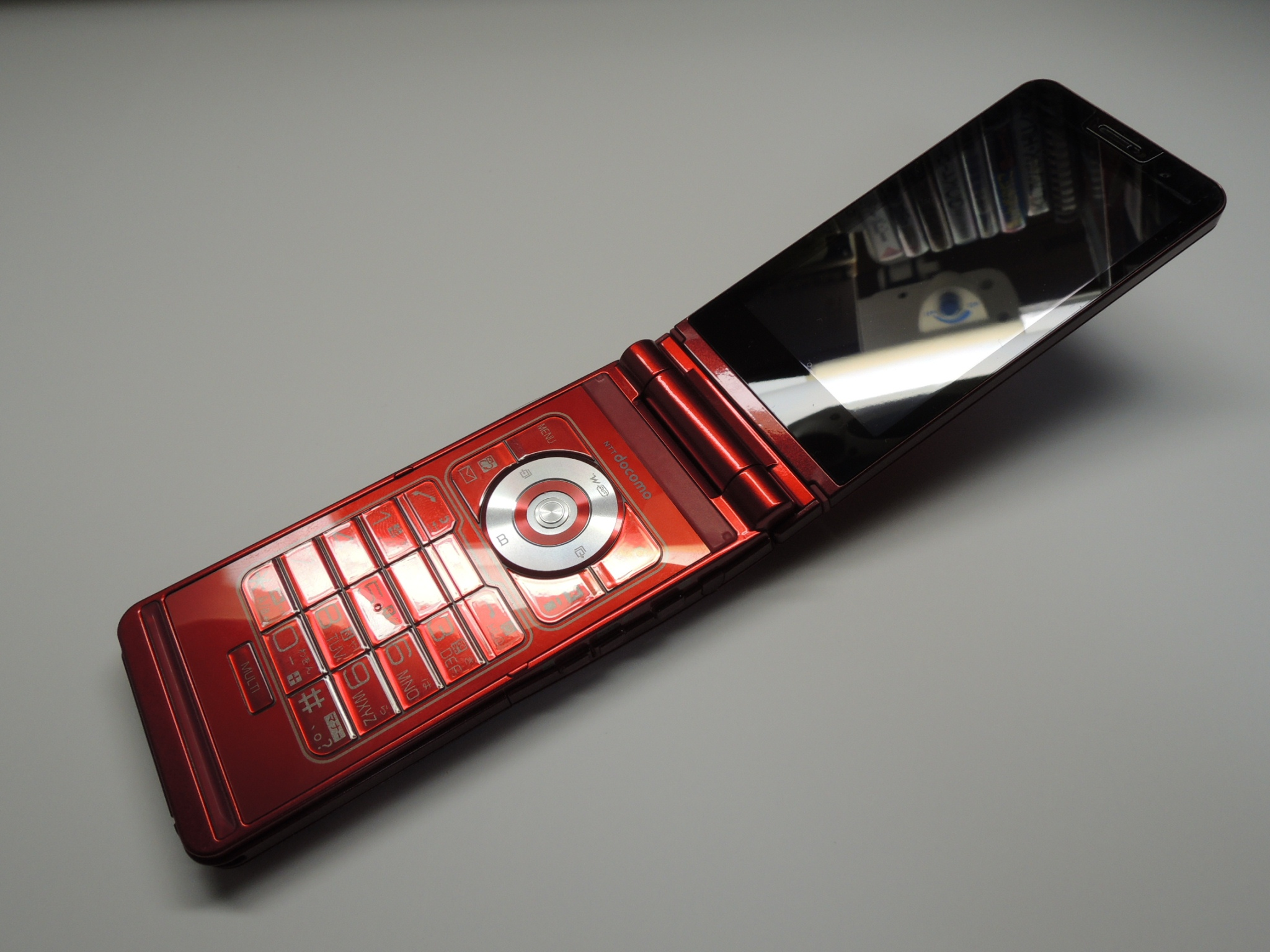
The front view, open, in Red colorway

Like its predecessor, the N-02B, the N-04B features a folding two-axis swivel design where the hinge forms a smooth curve when opened. The user interface is operated using NEC's signature Neuro Pointer alongside a touchscreen. The main TFT LCD display has been enlarged to 3.3 inches with a resolution of 480 × 854 pixels, while the sub-display is a 0.8-inch monochrome OLED with a resolution of 96 × 35 pixels.

The device features Wi-Fi (IEEE 802.11b/g) support with transmission speeds up to 54 Mbps, allowing users to upload large files such as photos and HD videos to blogs or video sharing sites. It includes an access point mode that allows up to four devices, such as PCs, PDAs, or Nintendo DS consoles, to connect simultaneously to the Internet. Furthermore, it supports wireless setup via NEC's "Raku Raku Wireless Start" and Buffalo's AOSS, integrates with Aiphone "Keitai de Doorphone" systems for home intercom access, and includes "Medias Link" for DLNA streaming across home networks.

The primary rear camera uses a 12.2-megapixel CMOS sensor with a f/2.8 equivalent 28mm wide-angle lens, capable of startup speeds in as fast as 0.6 seconds and continuous shot intervals of 1.4 seconds via a dedicated camera button. The camera software offers 11 auto-scene modes, ISO sensitivity up to 12800, touch-based object tracking focus, "Art Photo Mode", "Beauty Mode", high-brightness LED flash settings, super-resolution digital zoom, and HD video recording at 1280 × 720 resolution. A secondary front-facing 0.33-megapixel CMOS camera is included for video calls.

=== Software ===
The N-04B runs on the Access Linux Platform combined with Operator Pack (OPP-L), which includes "NetFront™ Living Connect". Unlike earlier NEC handsets that utilized the proprietary Mogic Engine, text entry on the N-04B is powered by iWnn due to operator package requirements, while retaining T9 single-touch input support.
