= BlackBerry Bold =

Line of BlackBerry smartphones

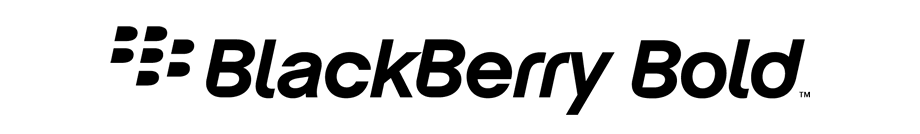
- Manufacturer: Research In Motion
- Availability by region: 2008–2013
- Predecessor: BlackBerry Curve 8330; BlackBerry 8800/8830
- Successor: BlackBerry Q10; BlackBerry Classic; BlackBerry Z10
- Operating system: BlackBerry OS
- Data inputs: QWERTY
- Development status: Discontinued
- Website: blackberry.com/blackberrybold at the Wayback Machine (archived 2008-09-02)

The BlackBerry Bold was a line of mid-range and high-end smartphones developed by BlackBerry Limited. The lineup was launched in 2008 with the BlackBerry Bold 9000, originally a flagship BlackBerry device before the introduction of the BlackBerry Storm. In 2009, the form factor was made more compact with the 9700 and the 9630. In 2010, the 9650 and 9780 were released with BlackBerry OS 6. In 2011, the 9780 was replaced by the 9790/9788 alongside the 9900/9930 series. The 9900/9930 and 9790, which have additional touchscreen displays, released in August and November 2011, respectively.

The Bold family was known for its distinctive form factor, QWERTY keyboard, and typical BlackBerry messaging capabilities with a different keyboard design than the Curve and Pearl series. The Bold series was usually more expensive and had more expensive materials (e.g. leather, soft touch rubber, carbon fiber, metal) compared to the Curve (plastic, glossy), and had higher specifications. There were two basic form factors within the Bold line: the original larger size on the 9000 and 9900, and the compact form factor of the other models.

== Early series ==
=== BlackBerry Bold 9000 ===
The BlackBerry Bold 9000 was the first Bold model.

=== BlackBerry Bold 9700 ===
The BlackBerry Bold 9700 (codenamed "Onyx") was released on December 18, 2009. While it shares most of its features with the larger models, the difference in the 9700's specifications are as follows:

- Wi-Fi calling supported UMA (Carrier dependent)
- Browser – HTML browsing, View Movies/Clips from websites built for mobile streaming, RSS feed support
- Voice Dialling

All pre-loaded BlackBerry applications are available on the Bold 9700, including but not limited to: WordToGo, PowerPointToGo, BrickBreaker and WordMole. The Bold 9700 also offers BlackBerry Messenger 4.7 but is upgradable to 7.1 in the BlackBerry App World. By upgrading the OS to version 6.0, a user also automatically upgrades to higher versions of applications.

=== BlackBerry Bold 9650 ===
BlackBerry Bold 9650
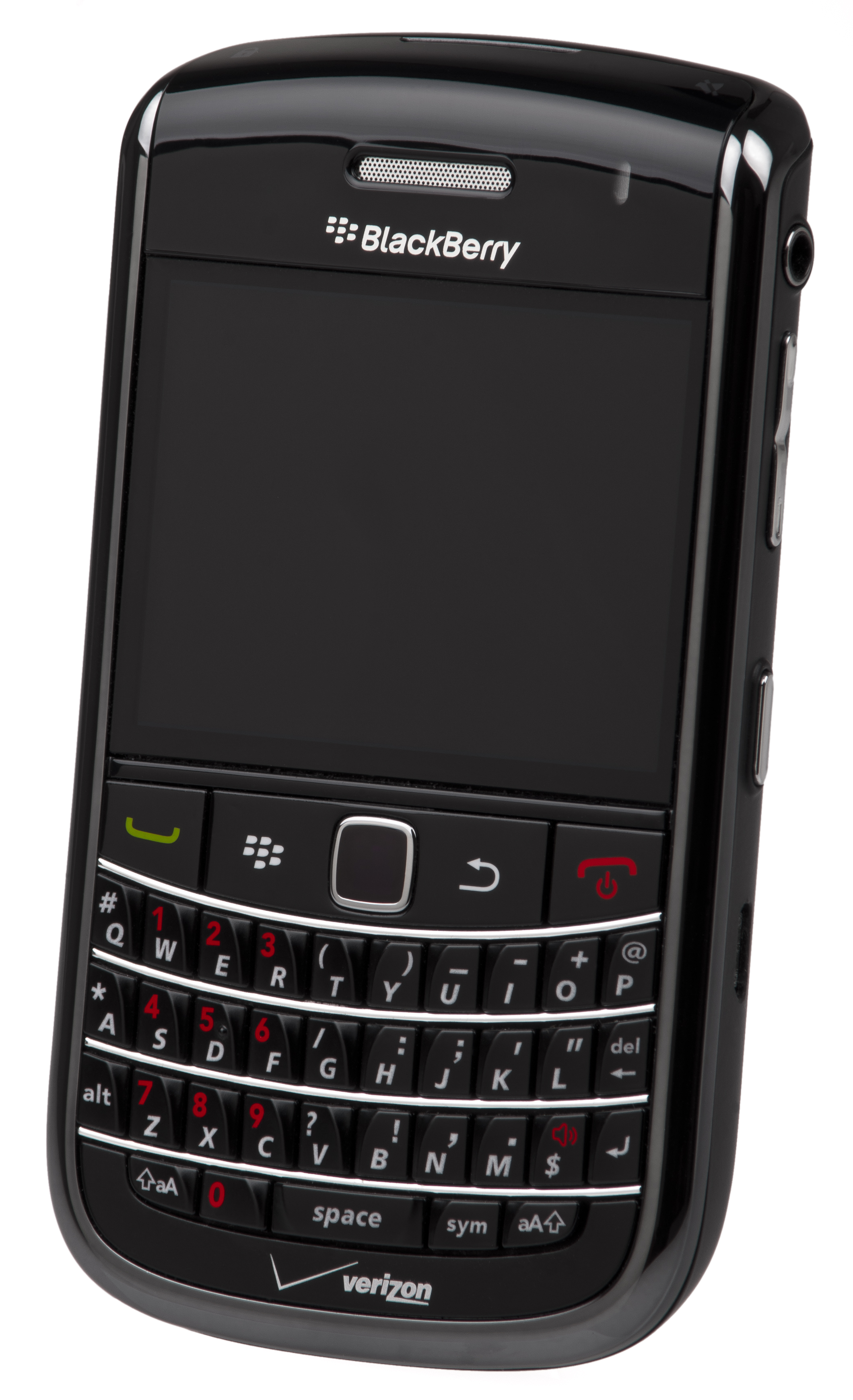
- Availability by region: Sprint Nextel: May 23, 2010; Verizon Wireless: June 3, 2010 (Online) June 10, 2010 (Retail Stores)

The BlackBerry Bold 9650 is part of the 9600 device series which takes design cues from both its predecessor, the BlackBerry Tour 9630, as well as its GSM variant, the BlackBerry Bold 9700 & the BlackBerry Bold 9780. Changes from the Tour include built-in Wi-Fi, 512 MB of onboard storage, and an optical trackpad instead of the trackball. It utilizes a 528 MHz processor, and has a 3.4 MP camera available as an option. The major difference between the 9700/9780 vs the 9650 is that the 9650 is the World Phone Edition that can use CDMA & GSM networks globally; the 9700/9780 only runs on GSM networks. Sprint Nextel announced that they would be the launch carrier for the Bold 9650 shortly after the device was introduced, releasing the phone on May 23, 2010. Verizon Wireless followed closely, releasing the phone exclusively online on June 3, 2010, followed by its retail stores on June 10, 2010. It was released in Canada the week of April 27, 2010.

=== BlackBerry Bold 9780 Series ===
The BlackBerry Bold 9780 was released in November 2010. On September 7, 2011 China Mobile and BlackBerry announced a variant known as the Bold 9788. The 9788 variant is identical to the 9700 except that the 9788 uses a Chinese 3G standard known as TD-SCDMA.

The 9780 shares the same form factor as the 9700, and the only notable differences are an improved camera (5.0 MP vs. 3.2 MP) and double the onboard memory of the 9700 (512 MB vs. 256 MB). Both devices are OS 6.0 capable, with the 9780 having OS 6 already installed. Additionally, the chrome chassis around the older Bold models had been omitted.

== BlackBerry 7 series ==
On August 3, 2011 BlackBerry announced their seventh major release of BlackBerry OS. It included several major changes such as universal voice search, support for HTML5, Liquid Graphics and Near field communication. It also has many optimizations which improve web and gaming experiences as well as social network integration as well as some layout changes with some new icons. BlackBerry OS 7 comes bundled with the premium version of Documents To Go. On January 9, 2012 BlackBerry announced BlackBerry OS 7.1 which allows Wi-Fi Tethering, BlackBerry Tag and UMA calling.

=== BlackBerry Bold 9900/9930 ===
BlackBerry Bold 9900/9930
- Availability by region: (Canada) August 10, 2011 (Rogers) (United Kingdom) August 12, 2011 (Vodafone) (Canada) August 12, 2011 (Bell, Telus) (United States) August 15, 2011 (Verizon) (United States) August 21, 2011 (Sprint) (United Kingdom) August 21, 2011 (O2) (United States) August 31, 2011 (T-Mobile) (Australia) September 1, 2011 (Optus) (Australia) November 3, 2011 (Vodafone) (Hong Kong) Sept 7, 2011 (SmarTone, 3, China Mobile, Vodafone, CSL) (Canada) Oct 19, 2011 (WINDMobile) (United States) Nov 6, 2011 (AT&T)
- Successor: BlackBerry Q10

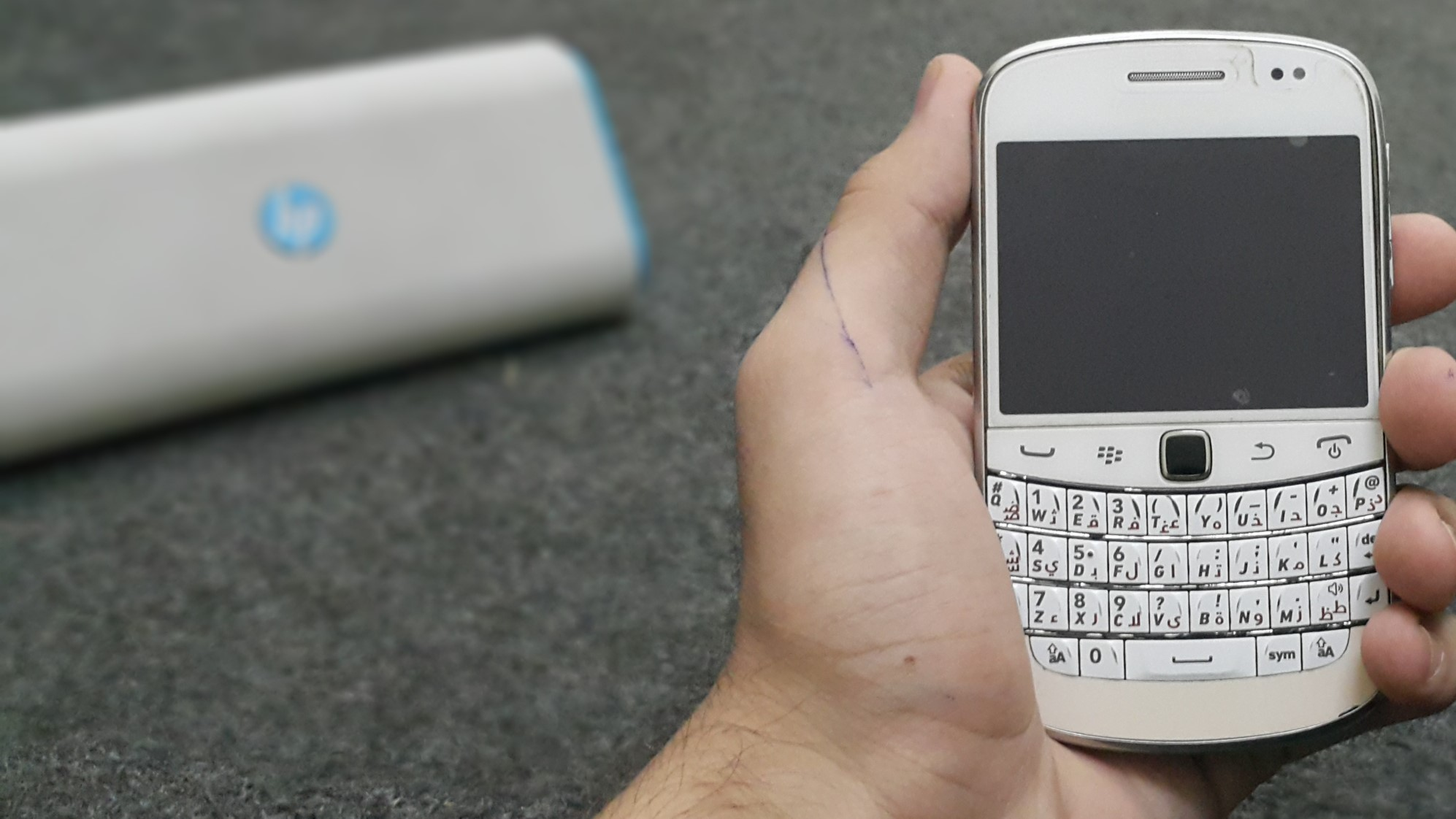
Blackberry Bold 9900 in white

The BlackBerry Bold 9900/9930 (codenamed internally as "Dakota/Montana", also known as Bold Touch) is part of the 9000 device series. Introduced in August 2011, it is the first of the Bold line to provide a touchscreen. It marks a return to the form factor of the original 9000 and its popular wide-set physical keyboard. It takes design cues from both its predecessor, the BlackBerry Tour 9630, as well as its GSM variant, the BlackBerry Bold 9700.

- Thinnest BlackBerry to date
- Glass fibre Cover for battery compartment
- NFC technology

The Bold 9900 was launched in Thailand at the DTAC 3G Expo on September 3–4th 2011. Soon after, many users were complaining that the phone was not 100% reliable for daily use as it often "froze" during the use of BBM (BlackBerry Messenger). The browser was also one of the main problems, as the touch was not as smooth as BlackBerry advertised. Both issues were promptly resolved through the over-the-air software releases of BBM 6.0 and BlackBerry OS 7.1, respectively. The Bold 9930 operates on both GSM and CDMA networks whereas the Bold 9900 can only function on the GSM network. However, the Bold 9900 can function in GSM bands that the 9930 cannot use. On select carriers, the Bold 9900 was the first BlackBerry phone to show 3G HSPA+ as "4G".

=== BlackBerry Bold 9790 ===
Introduced on November 15, 2011, the BlackBerry Bold 9790 follows the compact ergonomics of the previous Bold 9780, with an upgraded 1 GHz processor. The camera features an autofocus, but can only produce VGA resolution videos. Other specifications are identical to the 9900. Unlike the other models of the Bold lineup, the 9790's overall design is more similar to the all-touchscreen BlackBerry Torch 9860, particularly the back side.

== Model comparison ==
=== Early series ===
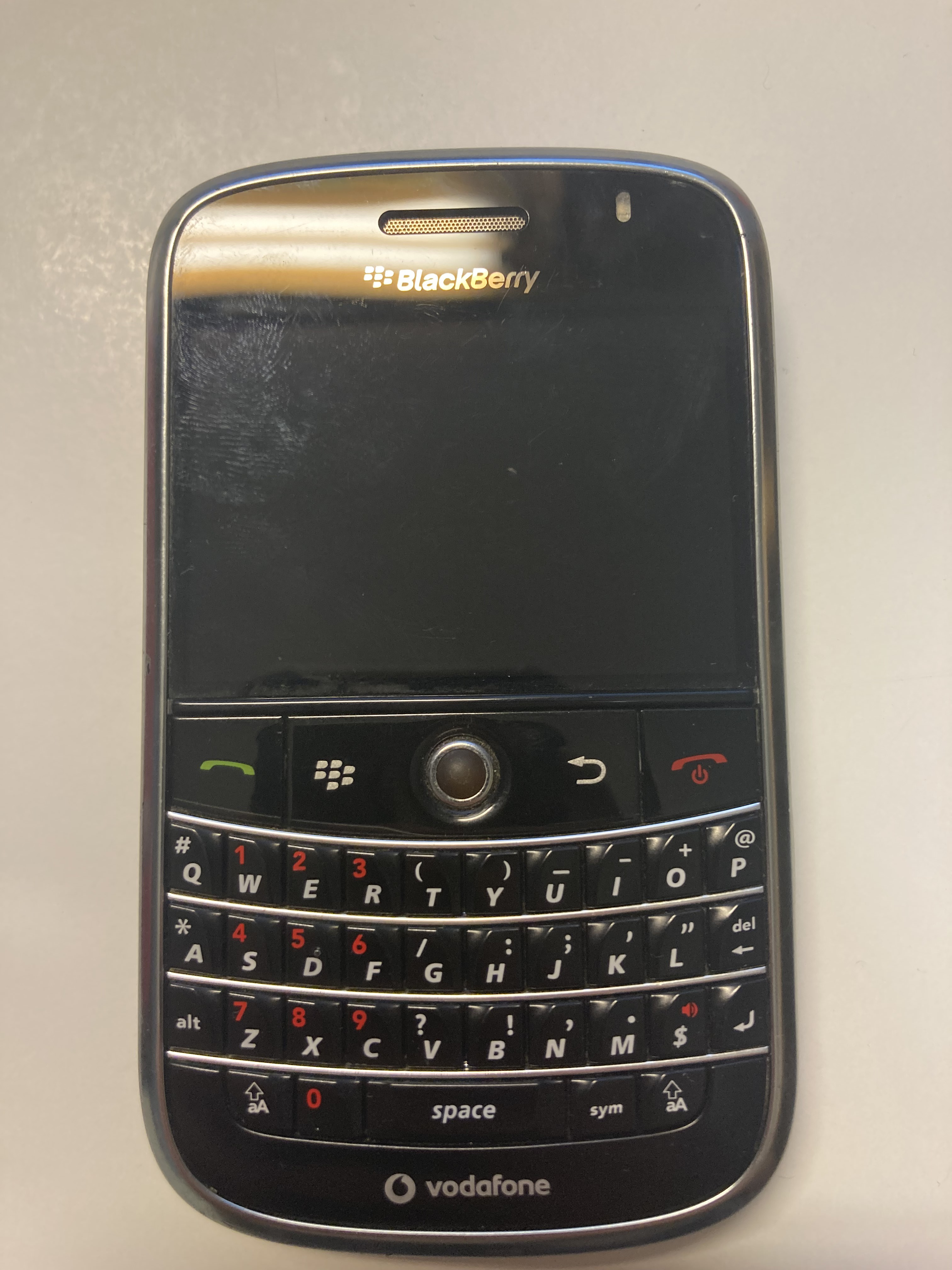
BlackBerry Bold 9000

Model		BlackBerry Bold 9000	BlackBerry Bold 9700	BlackBerry Bold 9650	BlackBerry Bold 9780	BlackBerry Bold 9788
Image		Blackberry 9000	Blackberry 9700	BlackBerry Bold 9650	BlackBerry Bold 9780	
Announced date		May 12, 2008	October 21, 2009	April 26, 2010	October 27, 2010	September 6, 2011
Display		480x320 px 2.6 inch (built on 110 μm pixel) at 221 ppi	480x360 px 2.44 inch (built on 100 μm pixel) at 244 ppi			
Processor		624 MHz Marvell Tavor PXA930		Qualcomm MSM7600 @ 528 MHz	624 MHz	
Memory	Media storage	1 GB	microSD slot only; 2 GB card included			
Memory	RAM	128 MB	256 MB	512 MB		
Inputs		Trackball, keyboard	Optical trackpad, keyboard			
WiFi / Bluetooth		802.11a/b/g, Bluetooth 2.0 + A2DP	802.11b/g, Bluetooth 2.1 + A2DP			
Compatible Networks		2G GSM and 3G HSPA		2G GSM, 3G CDMA and 3G HSPA	2G GSM and 3G HSPA	2G GSM and 3G TD-SCDMA
Operating system		BlackBerry OS 4 / 5	BlackBerry OS 5 / 6		BlackBerry OS 6	
Battery		1500 mAH		1400 mAH	1500 mAH	
Weight		136 g (4.8 oz)	122 g (4.3 oz)	136 g (4.8 oz)	122 g (4.3 oz)	
Dimensions		114 mm × 66 mm × 15 mm (4.49 in × 2.60 in × 0.59 in)	109 mm × 60 mm × 14 mm (4.29 in × 2.36 in × 0.55 in)	112 mm × 62 mm × 14 mm (4.41 in × 2.44 in × 0.55 in)	109 mm × 60 mm × 14 mm (4.29 in × 2.36 in × 0.55 in)	
Camera		2.0 MP	3.2 MP		5 MP	

=== BlackBerry 7 series ===
Model		BlackBerry Bold 9900	BlackBerry Bold 9930	BlackBerry Bold 9790
Image		BlackBerry Bold 9900		Photo of a black BlackBerry Bold 9790, english keyboard.
Announce Date		August 3, 2011		November 15, 2011
Display		640 x 480 px 2.8 inch TFT LCD (built on 88 μm pixel) at 287 ppi		480 x 360 px 2.45 inch TFT LCD (built on 100 μm pixel) at 246 ppi
Processor		Qualcomm Snapdragon 2 MSM8255T processor 1.2 GHz		Marvell Tavor MG1 PXA940 1 GHz
GPU		Adreno 205		PowerVR SGX 543 GPU
RAM		768 MB		
Storage		8 GB Internal Storage microSD slot		
Inputs		Multi-touch touchscreen, volume controls, proximity and ambient light sensors, 3-axis accelerometer, Digital Compass, GPS/aGPS		
Connectivity		802.11a/b/g/n Dual band Bluetooth 2.1 + A2DP + EDR; Near field communication		
Compatible Networks	GSM/GPRS/EDGE	850/900/1800/1900 MHz		
Compatible Networks	UMTS/HSPA	2100/1900/850/800 MHz (RDE7*UW/RDY7*UW) or 2100/1700/900 MHz (RDV7*UW)	2100/900 MHz	2100/1900/850/800 MHz (REC71UW) or 2100/1700/900 MHz (RED71UW)
Compatible Networks	CDMA/EVDO	—N/a	800/1900 MHz	—N/a
HSDPA		14.4 Mbit/s		7.2 Mbit/s
HSUPA		5.76 Mbit/s		
Operating system		BlackBerry OS 7		
Battery		1230 mAH Replaceable Lithium-ion polymer battery 12.8 days standby (GSM/UMTS); 6.3 hours talk (GSM); 5.9 hours talk (UMTS); 50 hours music playback	1230 mAH Replaceable Lithium-ion polymer battery 12.8 days standby (CDMA/GSM/UMTS); 6.6 hours talk (CDMA); 6.3 hours talk(GSM); 5.9 hours talk (UMTS); 50 hours music playback	1230 mAH Replaceable Lithium-ion polymer battery 18 days standby (GSM); 17 days standby (UMTS); 5.2 hours talk(GSM); 5.3 hours talk (UMTS); 33 hours music playback 6.3 hours video playback
Weight		130 g (4.6 oz)		107 g (3.8 oz)
Dimensions		115 mm × 66 mm × 10.5 mm (4.53 in × 2.60 in × 0.41 in)		110 mm × 60 mm × 11.4 mm (4.33 in × 2.36 in × 0.45 in)
Camera		5 megapixel 4x digital zoom Flash; HD video (720p) at 30 fps		5 megapixel Continuous auto focus 2x digital zoom Flash; VGA at 30 fps
