= BlackBerry Torch =

Series of smartphones

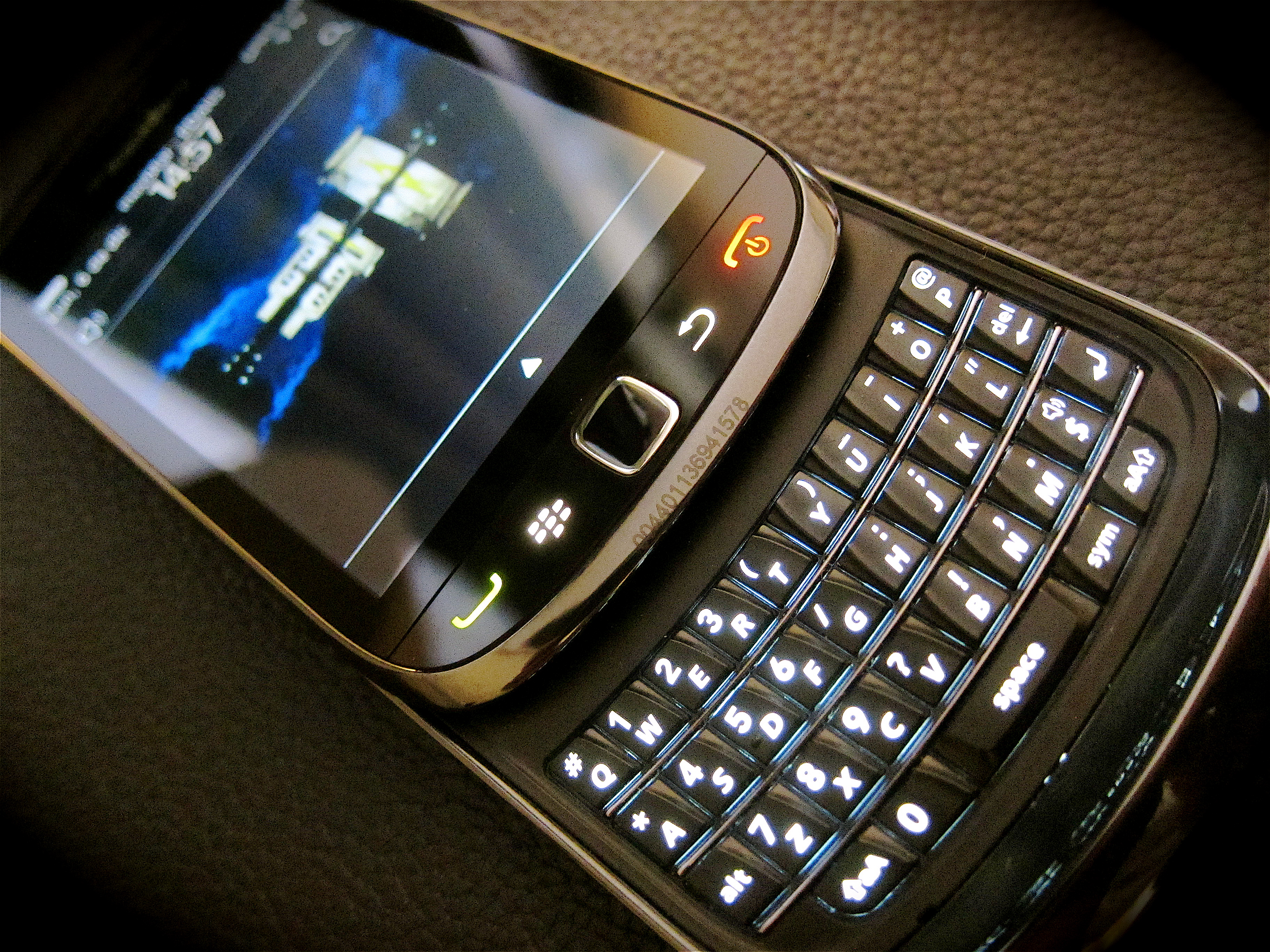
- The BlackBerry Torch 9800
- Manufacturer: BlackBerry Ltd
- Availability by region: August 12, 2010
- Compatible networks: Quad band GSM/GPRS/EDGE networks: 850/900/1800/1900MHz; Tri band 3G UMTS networks: 2100/1900/850/800 MHz
- Form factor: Slider smartphone
- Dimensions: 4.37x2.44x0.57 in (111x62x14.6 mm)
- Weight: 5.68 oz (161.1 g)
- Operating system: BlackBerry OS 6.0 (9800); BlackBerry OS 7.1 (others)
- CPU: 624 MHz Marvell Tavor PXA940
- Memory: 512MB (768 on 9810)RAM, 4GB storage, (8GB on 9810) microSD slot
- Rear camera: 5.0 megapixel with scene options and auto-focus
- Display: 360x480 px (0.17 megapixels) 3.2 inch
- Data inputs: Trackpad, keyboard, Multi-touch touchscreen
- Development status: Discontinued

BlackBerry Torch is a series of smartphones manufactured by BlackBerry Ltd. The lineup consists of the following:

- BlackBerry Torch 9800, the first phone in the series, powered by BlackBerry OS 6.
- BlackBerry Torch 9810, which physically mimics the 9800, but with improved internal hardware and BlackBerry OS 7.
- BlackBerry Torch 9850/9860, featuring a larger touch screen, no keyboard, and BlackBerry OS 7.

On August 12, 2011, the updated Torch 9810 was released on Bell Mobility and Telus Mobility. The updated version includes a faster processor, HD video recording, and more memory, as well as including the new BlackBerry OS 7.

== BlackBerry Torch 9800 ==
The BlackBerry Torch 9800 is a 2010 model in the BlackBerry line of smartphones. It combines a physical QWERTY keyboard with a sliding multi-touch screen display and runs on BlackBerry OS 6. Introduced on August 3, 2010, the phone became available exclusively on AT&T on August 12, 2010.

The device looks similar to existing BlackBerry devices, but due to the sliding keyboard features a bigger 3.2 inch 480x360 screen (the same resolution as the BlackBerry Storm and BlackBerry Storm 2) and these features allow the BlackBerry Torch 9800 to look unique. The software is seen by most to be an improvement over the previous version.

=== History ===
Speculation of the Torch began in April 2010 when RIM CEO Mike Lazaridis introduced the BlackBerry 6 operating system during his keynote address at WES 2010. A new touchscreen device was widely anticipated as the OS 6 update seemed to be touch/gesture based. Images of a BlackBerry device prototype with a touchscreen and slide-out QWERTY keyboard started emerging in late spring and early summer of 2010. The device was tentatively named the "Bold 9800" or simply the "9800 Slider". The 9800 eventually was officially named the "Torch" by RIM during its August announcement. It can be assumed that the device name was derived from Torch Mobile, the company that RIM purchased in 2009 in aid with their development of a WebKit based browser.

=== Reception ===
The BlackBerry Torch 9800 was marketed as "the best BlackBerry ever". However, upon release of the device's technical details, critics, such as PC World's Ginny Mies, were not impressed with the specifications which lagged behind new-generation devices such as the iPhone 4 and Droid X. One reviewer did not find enough difference over earlier BlackBerry phones to recommend the device to new users. Key complaints were the 624 MHz processor included in the Torch, whereas the HTC Evo 4G and Motorola Droid X (among others of their class) featured a 1 GHz processor. The Torch's 3.2 inch screen with 480x360 screen resolution was also criticized as being smaller than iPhone 4's 3.5 inch screen with 960x640 resolution and the Motorola Droid X's 4.3 inch with 854 x 480. The Torch has a screen that is the same size as the Storm and Storm 2 with a resolution the same as the Bold 9700, Bold 9650 and Tour 9630. Some critics also noted the lack of HD video recording and the lack of a front-facing camera.

CNET's Bonnie Cha found improvements such as the better user interface, universal search and the much improved browser and multimedia experience. On the other hand, she also found that the smartphone can be sluggish, and could stand for some hardware upgrades, although her review was generally positive.

RIM has stated that the processor in the Torch is 'of a newer generation', when boot times of the Torch and the BlackBerry Bold 9700 (both running OS6) are compared the Torch boots up 1.8 times faster than the Bold with the "older processor".

UBM techinsite has confirmed the claims of Research in Motion, by performing a "tear-down" and making a hardware analysis, discovering a PXA940 Processor. This processor is built on 45nm as opposed to the processor found in the Blackberry Bold 9700. The 45 nm process keeps heat production and power usage down, and the processor as previously stated in this article brings significant performance gains.

Anandtech praised the screen of the phone as being: "one of the most readable outside that I've encountered in a while, with text and webpages being easy to make out even in intense daylight. Alongside the iPhone 4, the difference is pretty immediate, especially in how good white appears on the Torch compared to the iPhone 4. Anandtech also noted that the contrast ratio was exceptionally good.

Crackberry's Kevin Michaluk gave the BlackBerry Torch an overwhelmingly positive review stating that the Torch is a "worthy device for any smartphone owner". Crackberry praised OS 6.0, the form factor, touchscreen, and the WebKit browser. However, Michaluk criticized the lack of HD video recording and lack of OpenGL support for 3D graphics.

=== Sales ===
Initial sales of the BlackBerry Torch were slow to moderate, with AT&T Wireless Operations president expressing some disappointment in the sales stating that he was "surprised there hasn't been a faster adoption" of the smart phone by the public. Estimates put sales at somewhere between 100,000 and 150,000 devices sold during the first week of release. However, sales reportedly improved in the months following the release and RIM shipped a record amount of smart phones in the final quarter of 2010. The BlackBerry Torch placed 6th place on Wirefly's annual top ten selling smart phones list for 2010, selling more than Motorola's Droid 2 and Samsung's Galaxy S Fascinate, but behind devices like the Evo 4G and Droid Incredible.

== OS 7 series ==
=== BlackBerry Torch 9810 ===
The BlackBerry Torch 9810 is a successor to the 9800, although featuring a physically similar design, except for the Answer/Decline buttons, which were recolored to white. Improvements includes a 1.2 GHz processor (doubling from the 9800's 624 MHz processor), a VGA (640×480) resolution display, at 246 DPI, upgraded RAM from 512 MB to 768 MB, and increased flash storage from 4 GB to 8 GB.

BlackBerry OS 7 is included with the BlackBerry Torch 9810. This OS supports OpenGL ES and other APIs for additional features. For example, the device has an enhanced GPS navigation system installed. A HSPA+ (often branded as 4G) version was available with select carriers eventually.

=== BlackBerry Torch 9850/9860 ===
The BlackBerry Torch 9860 is a full-touchscreen model without a physical keyboard, first announced on August 3, 2011. It is the third full-touch BlackBerry device succeeding the previous two BlackBerry Storm models. Unlike the Storm, the SurePress display is now omitted in favor to a more conventional capacitive touchscreen. It also offered the largest screen of any BlackBerry device until the release of the BlackBerry Z10 in 2013.

Aside from the lack of physical keyboard, most specifications of the 9850/9860 are identical to the 9810, except the internal storage capacity is reduced to 4 GB, making it similar to the original 9800 model.

In Canada, the Torch 9860 was available at Bell Mobility, Rogers Wireless, Sasktel, Telus Mobility, and Videotron. Bell, Rogers and Telus have since discontinued it.

In India, the Torch 9860 is available at Mobile Store, BlackBerry exclusive showroom, and many retail stores dealing in mobile.

== Model comparison ==
=== BlackBerry Torch 9800 ===
- Size:
  - 111mm × 62mm × 14.6mm (closed)
  - 148mm × 62mm × 14.6mm (open)
- Weight: 5.68 ounces (161 grams)
- Processor: Marvell PXA940 running at 624 MHz
- Image System Processor (ISP): STmicroelectronics STV0987
- Display: 3.2 inch HVGA+(480x360) Synaptics controlled touch screen
- Camera: 5.0 MP camera (JPEG encoding) with flash, 2x digital zoom, image stabilization and auto-focus
- Video recorder: up to 480p resolution
- Battery: 1300 mAhr removable/rechargeable lithium-ion cell
- Battery life: 18 days (GSM) or 14 days (UMTS) standby; 5.5 hours (GSM) or 5.8 hours (UMTS) talk
- GPS using A-GPS with extended ephemeris and maps
- Input: trackpad, touch screen with on-screen keyboard (QWERTY and SureType), slide-out backlit QWERTY keyboard
- Video format support: MPEG4, H.263, H.264, WMV3
- Audio format support: MP3, AMR-NB, AAC-LC, AAC+, eAAC+, WMA, WMV, FLAC, Ogg Vorbis
- Ringtones: MIDI, MP3
- Connectivity: 3G; Bluetooth 2.1 + EDR; 802.11 b/g/n Wi-Fi; 3.5mm stereo headset, Micro-USB
- Networks:
  - Tri-band 3G UMTS/HSDPA networks: 2100/1900/850/800 MHz
  - Quad-band GSM/GPRS/EDGE networks: 850/900/1800/1900 MHz

=== OS 7 series ===
Model		BlackBerry Torch 9810	BlackBerry Torch 9850	BlackBerry Torch 9860
Image				
Announce date		August 3, 2011		
Display		640 × 480 px 24-bit 3.2 inch TFT LCD (built on 100 μm pixel) at 253 ppi	800 × 480 px 24-bit 3.7 inch TFT LCD (built on 100 μm pixel) at 253 ppi	
Processor		Qualcomm Snapdragon MSM8655 processor 1.2 GHz		
GPU		Adreno 205		
RAM		768 MB		
Storage		8 GB Internal microSD slot	4 GB Internal microSD slot	
Inputs		Multi-touch touchscreen display with haptic feedback, volume controls, proximity and ambient light sensors, 3-axis accelerometer, Digital Compass, GPS/aGPS		
Connectivity		802.11a/b/g/n Bluetooth 2.1 + A2DP + EDR		
Compatible Networks	GSM/GPRS/EDGE	850/900/1800/1900 MHz		
Compatible Networks	UMTS/HSPA	2100/1900/850/800 MHz	2100 MHz	2100/1900/850/800 MHz or 2100/1700/900 MHz
Compatible Networks	CDMA/EVDO	—N/a	800/1900 MHz	—N/a
Operating system		BlackBerry OS 7		
Battery		1270 mAH Lithium-ion polymer battery 12.8 days standby (GSM); 12.3 days standby (UMTS); 6.9 hours talk (GSM); 5.9 hours talk (UMTS); 54 hours music playback 7 hours video playback	1230 mAH Lithium-ion polymer battery 13.4 days standby (CDMA); 11.8 days standby (UMTS); 6.8 hours talk (CDMA); 6.1 hours talk (UMTS); 50.2 hours music playback 6.6 hours video playback	1230 mAH Lithium-ion polymer battery 13.9 days standby (GSM); 13.5 days standby (UMTS); 4.7 hours talk(GSM); 6.8 hours talk (UMTS); 44 hours music playback 6.6 hours video playback
Weight		161 g (5.7 oz)	135 g (4.8 oz)	
Dimensions		111 mm × 62 mm × 14.6 mm (4.37 in × 2.44 in × 0.57 in) (closed)	120 mm × 62 mm × 11.5 mm (4.72 in × 2.44 in × 0.45 in)	
Camera		5 megapixel 4× digital zoom Flash; HD video (720p) at 30 fps		
