= BlackBerry Torch 9800 =

2010 BlackBerry Smartphone

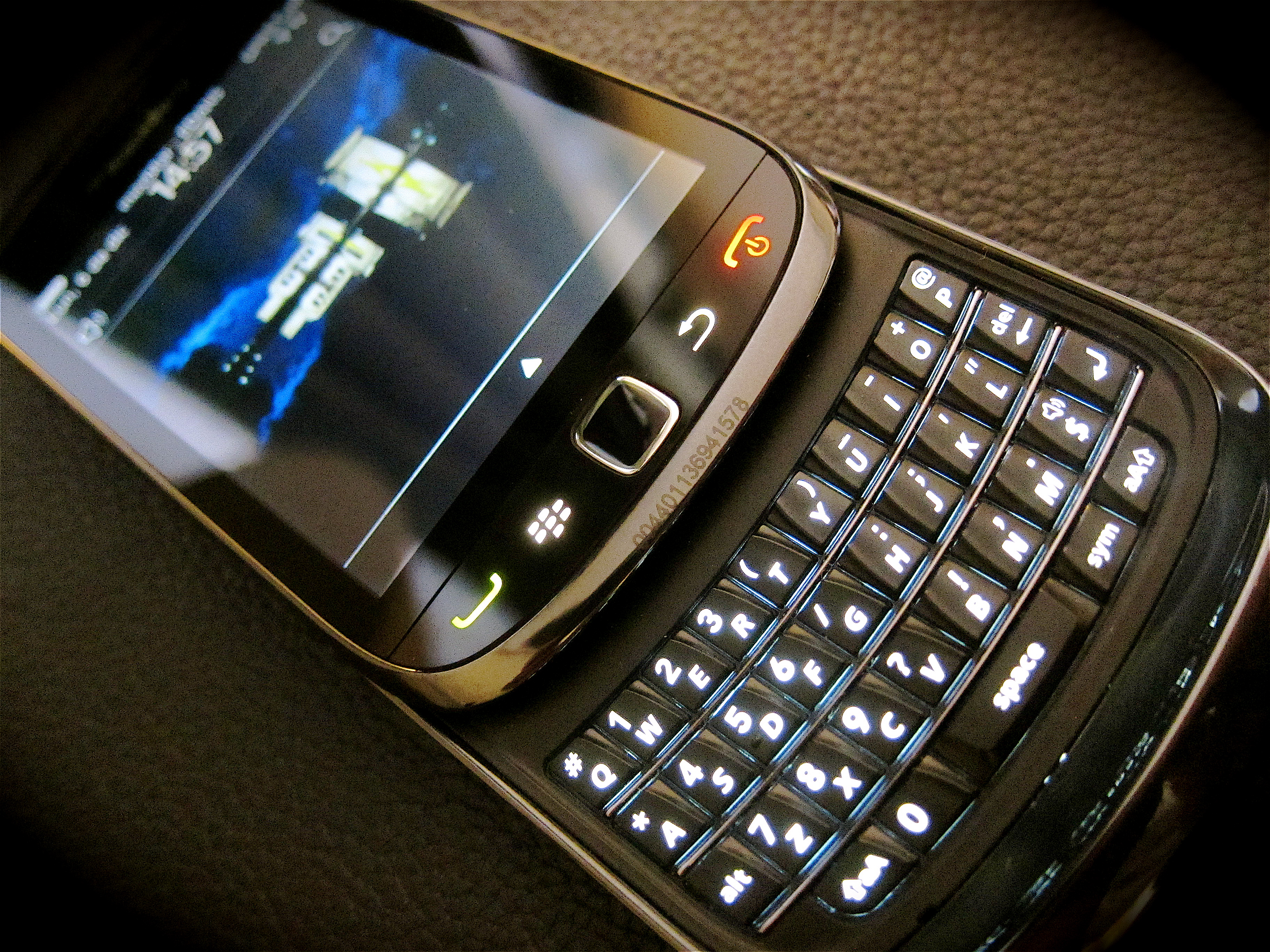
- Manufacturer: Research In Motion
- Availability by region: August 12, 2010
- Compatible networks: Quad band GSM/GPRS/EDGE networks: 850/900/1800/1900MHz; Tri band 3G UMTS networks: 2100/1900/850/800 MHz
- Form factor: Slider smartphone
- Dimensions: 4.37x2.44x0.57 in (111x62x14.6 mm)
- Weight: 5.68 oz (161.1 g)
- Operating system: BlackBerry OS 6
- CPU: 624 MHz Marvell Tavor PXA940 (ARM Cortex A8) compliant
- Memory: 512MB RAM, 4GB storage, microSD slot
- Rear camera: 5.0 megapixel with scene options and auto-focus
- Display: 360x480 px (0.17 megapixels) 3.2 inch
- Data inputs: Trackpad, keyboard, Multi-touch touchscreen

The BlackBerry Torch 9800 is a smartphone of the BlackBerry line combining a physical QWERTY keyboard with a sliding multi-touch screen display. Introduced on August 3, 2010, the phone became available exclusively on AT&T on August 12, 2010.

The Torch looks similar to other BlackBerry devices of the time, but due to the sliding keyboard features a bigger 3.2 inch 480x360 screen (the same resolution as the BlackBerry Storm and BlackBerry Storm 2) and these features allow the BlackBerry Torch 9800 to look unique. It runs on BlackBerry OS 6 and the software is seen by most to be an improvement over the previous version. The device also features far greater social network integration, a powerful universal search feature, and a WebKit browser comparable to those found on iOS and Android devices.

On August 12, 2011, the updated Torch 9810 was released on Bell Mobility and Telus Mobility. The updated version includes a faster processor, and more memory, as well as including the new BlackBerry OS 7.

== History ==
Speculation of the Torch began in April 2008 when RIM CEO Mike Lazaridis introduced the BlackBerry 6 operating system during his keynote address at WES 2010. A new touchscreen device was widely anticipated as the OS 6 update seemed to be touch/gesture based. Images of a BlackBerry device prototype with a touchscreen and slide-out QWERTY keyboard started emerging in late spring and early summer of 2010. The device was tentatively named the "Bold 9800" or simply the "9800 Slider". The 9800 eventually was officially named the "Torch" by RIM during its August announcement. It can be assumed that the device name was derived from Torch Mobile, the company that RIM purchased in 2009 in aid with their development of a Webkit based browser.

== Official Specifications ==
- Size:
  - 111mm x 62mm x 14.6mm (closed)
  - 148mm x 62mm x 14.6mm (open)
- Weight: 5.68 ounces (161.1 grams)
- Processor: Marvell PXA940 running at 624 MHz
- Image System Processor (ISP): STmicroelectronics STV0987
- Display: 3.2 inch HVGA+(480x360) Synaptics controlled touch screen
- Camera: 5.0 MP camera (JPEG encoding) with flash, 2x digital zoom, image stabilization and auto-focus
- Video recorder: up to 480p resolution
- Battery: 1300 mAh removable/rechargeable lithium-ion cell
- Battery life: 18 days (GSM) or 14 days (UMTS) standby; 5.5 hours (GSM) or 5.8 hours (UMTS) talk
- GPS using A-GPS with extended ephemeris and maps
- Input: trackpad, touch screen with on-screen keyboard (QWERTY and SureType), slide-out backlit QWERTY keyboard
- Video format support: MPEG4, H.263, H.264, WMV3
- Audio format support: MP3, AMR-NB, AAC-LC, AAC+, eAAC+, WMA, WMV, FLAC, Ogg Vorbis
- Ringtones: MIDI, MP3
- Connectivity: 3G; Bluetooth 2.1 + EDR; 802.11 b/g/n Wi-Fi; 3.5mm stereo headset, Micro-USB
- Networks:
  - Tri-band 3G UMTS/HSDPA networks: 2100/1900/850/800 MHz
  - Quad-band GSM/GPRS/EDGE networks: 850/900/1800/1900 MHz

== Reception ==
The BlackBerry Torch 9800 was marketed as "the best BlackBerry ever". However, upon release of the device's technical details, critics, such as PC World's Ginny Mies, were not impressed with the specifications which lagged behind new-generation devices such as the iPhone 4 and Droid X. One reviewer did not find enough difference over earlier BlackBerrys to recommend the device to new users. Key complaints were the 624 MHz processor included in the Torch, whereas the HTC Evo 4G and Motorola Droid X (among others of their class) featured a 1 GHz processor. The Torch's 3.2 inch screen with 480x360 screen resolution was also criticized as being smaller than iPhone 4's 3.5 inch screen with 960x640 resolution and the Motorola Droid X's 4.3 inch with 854 x 480. The Torch has a screen that is the same size as the Storm and Storm 2 with a resolution the same as the Bold 9700, Bold 9650 and Tour 9630. Some critics also noted the lack of HD video recording and the lack of a front-facing camera.

CNET's Bonnie Cha found improvements such as the better user interface, universal search and the much improved browser and multimedia experience. On the other hand, she also found that the smartphone can be sluggish, and could stand for some hardware upgrades, although her review was generally positive.

RIM has stated that the processor in the Torch is 'of a newer generation', when boot times of the Torch and the BlackBerry Bold 9700 (both running OS6) are compared the Torch boots up 1.8 times faster than the Bold with the "older processor".

UBM techinsite has confirmed the claims of Research in Motion, by performing a "tear down" and making a hardware analysis, discovering a PXA940 Processor. This processor is built on 45nm as opposed to the Processor found in the Blackberry Bold 1 and 2. The 45 nm process keeps heat production and power usage down, and the processor as previously stated in this article brings significant performance gains.

Anandtech praised the screen of the phone as being: "one of the most readable outside that I've encountered in a while, with text and webpages being easy to make out even in intense daylight. Alongside the iPhone 4, the difference is pretty immediate, especially in how good white appears on the Torch compared to the iPhone 4. Anandtech also noted that the contrast ratio was exceptionally good.

Crackberry's Kevin Michaluk gave the BlackBerry Torch an overwhelmingly positive review stating that the Torch is a "worthy device for any smartphone owner". Crackberry praised OS 6.0, the form factor, touchscreen, and the Webkit browser. However, Michaluk criticized the lack of HD video recording and lack of OpenGL support for 3D graphics.

== Sales ==
Initial sales of the BlackBerry Torch were slow to moderate, with AT&T Wireless Operations president expressing some disappointment in the sales stating that he was "surprised there hasn't been a faster adoption" of the smart phone by the public. Estimates put sales at somewhere between 100,000 and 150,000 devices sold during the first week of release. However, sales reportedly improved in the months following the release and RIM shipped a record amount of smart phones in the final quarter of 2010. The BlackBerry Torch placed 6th place on Wirefly's annual top ten selling smart phones list for 2010, selling more than Motorola's Droid 2 and Samsung's Galaxy S Fascinate, but behind devices like the Evo 4G and Droid Incredible.
