= 9800 =

9800 may refer to:

- The year 9800, in the 10th millennium.
- ATI Radeon 9800, a computer graphics card series
- GeForce 9800, a computer graphics card in Nvidia's GeForce 9 series
- BlackBerry Torch 9800, a smartphone by Research in Motion
- HP 9800 series, a series of Desktop Computer from Hewlett Packard
