= TalkBox Voice Messenger =

Instant messaging software

Talkbox Messenger
- Developer(s): Talkbox Limited
- Initial release: January 18, 2011
- Stable release: iPhone v1.94, Android (varies depend on devices), Windows Phone v1.2 and BlackBerry v1.1
- Operating system: iOS, Android, Windows Phone, BlackBerry
- Available in: multilingual
- Type: Instant Messaging Client
- Website: http://talkboxapp.com

Talkbox Messenger (formerly named TalkBox and Talkbox Voice Messenger) is a smartphone application that enables users of iPhone, Android, Windows Phone and BlackBerry to easily communicate via push-to-talk instant voice messages as well as sharing geo-location, pictures and group chat with one another. Users’ voice is carefully curated and delivered by Talkbox voice bubbles of maximum 1 minute. Talkbox also integrated with different social networking elements which enables users to post voice post using Agent Twitter or Agent Facebook. It can also be applied to different business scenario from talking to an oversea business acquaintance without having to schedule an appointment to brainstorming a new product ideas with the team using group chat.

Talkbox acquired one million users within one month of initial release.

On Feb 1,2019, the app was renamed as Talkbox Messenger, with release of version 3.0.
