= BlackBerry Bold 9700 =

Smartphone

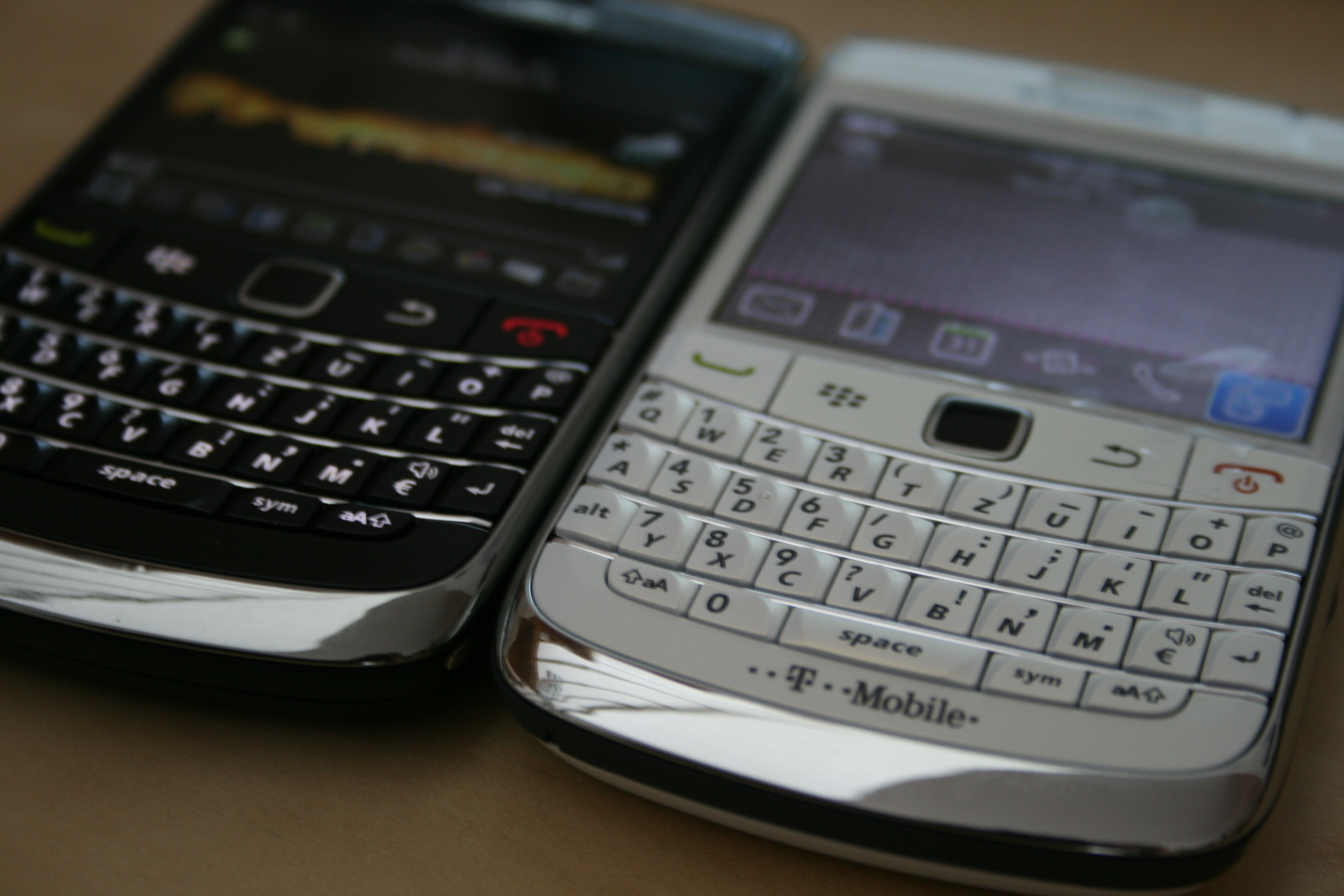
- Manufacturer: BlackBerry
- Availability by region: November 2009
- Successor: BlackBerry Bold 9650
- Related: BlackBerry Curve
- Compatible networks: GSM
- Form factor: Smartphone
- Dimensions: 109 mm (4.3 in) (h); 60 mm (2.4 in) (w); 14 mm (0.55 in) (d)
- Weight: 122 g (4.3 oz)
- Operating system: BlackBerry OS 5 upgradeable to version 6
- Battery: 1500 mAh
- Rear camera: 3 MP; LED flash
- Display: 2.4 in (6.1 cm), 480×360 non-touch LCD
- Sound: Single loudspeaker 3.5 mm audio jack Microphone
- Connectivity: Wi-Fi (802.11 b/g) (2.4 GHz only); Bluetooth 2.1
- Development status: Discontinued (December 2011)
- Website: BlackBerry Bold 9700 on blackberry.com at the Wayback Machine (archived 2009-12-25)

The BlackBerry Bold 9700 (codenamed Onyx) is a smartphone developed by telecommunication company BlackBerry, formerly known as Research in Motion (RIM). The second device in the Bold series, it succeeds the model 9000 and precedes the Bold 9650. The device, which runs on the BlackBerry OS, features several improvements over the 9000, including introduction of an optical trackpad, and a reduced size overall. Other visual changes were carried out in order to appeal both men and women.

Upon release, the BlackBerry Bold 9700 received mostly positive reviews from critics. The smartphone was commended for its design and most changes were favored, such as the trackpad. However, critics were ambivalent towards the dated software and the slow browser, and some concluded that the device did not set itself apart from previous models.

The BlackBerry Bold 9700 was succeeded by the upgraded version, the BlackBerry Bold 9780, introduced in October 2010. The BlackBerry Bold 9700 was discontinued in December 2011.

== History ==
=== Rumors and prototypes ===
Starting April 2009, various rumors circulated regarding the smartphone and other reportedly planned models for the BlackBerry line-up. The first rumor reported that a trio of devices were being developed as high-end smartphones, codenamed Onyx, Driftwood and Magnum. All of them were rumored to contain a "hybrid concept" with a touch screen and a QWERTY keyboard, with similar prototype designs but destined to different networks. Onyx was rumored to be released only for AT&T markets.

An image of one of Onyx's early prototypes surfaced online, with a similar hardware to the 9000's, including the same trackball. That prototype was early reviewed by website CrackBerry, which confirmed diverse details about the device, such as the 480×360 display, the 3.2 megapixels camera and connectivity features—Wi-Fi and GPS. The same day, other information regarding technicalities were revealed on a surfaced AT&T filesheet about the smartphone. Already known as the BlackBerry 9020 and having started production, a photo of the device surfaced, though it replaced the trackball with a trackpad. A previous prototype with a trackball was put up for sale on eBay, where it passed the mark of $600; four days later, a pre-launch list of then-upcoming smartphones for AT&T surfaced online on August 9, 2009, which listed the device. A T-Mobile press image was leaked on September 8.

=== Announcement and release ===
On October 7, 2009, technology website Engadget reported that mobile carriers T-Mobile and AT&T would publicly announce the Bold 9700 on October 21, 2009. Two days later, the website posted that rumors were circulating on the Internet, which predicted that the smartphone would be released to the United States T-Mobile on November 11, 2009. The aforementioned carrier was then revealed to be sending invitations to "executive briefing" events—taking place in Los Angeles on November 3, 2009; in New York City. T-Mobile Germany announced on October 15, 2009 that the Bold 9700 would be released in that country in November.

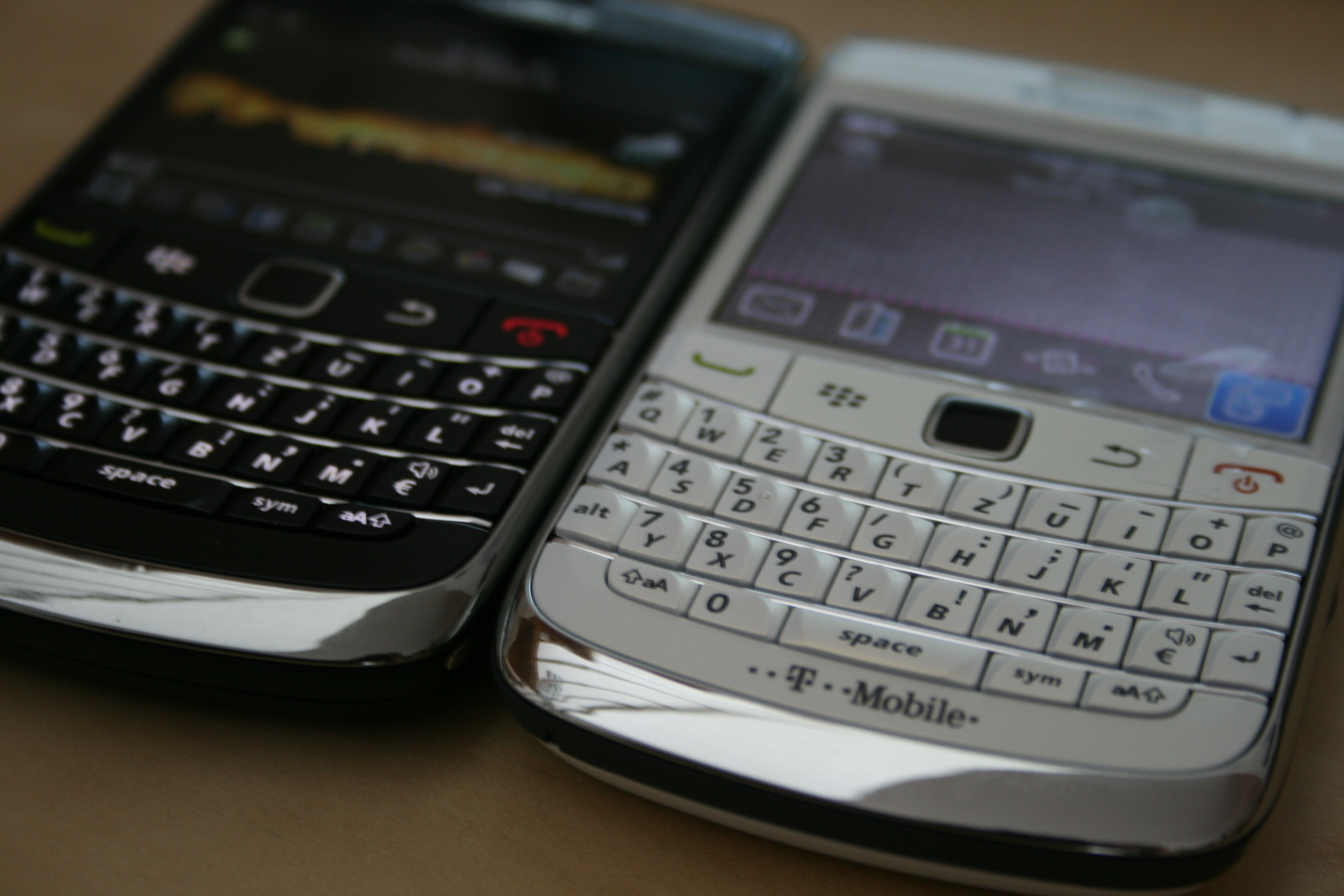
Bold 9700 in its black and white versions

The device was officially presented in Bochum, Germany—where it was developed—on October 21, 2009. The launch event was hosted by BlackBerry (then known as RIM) vice chairman Mike Lazaridis. Boy Genius Report reported on November 4 of that year that the smartphone would be available early five days later for "select business customers". On November 16, it was officially released to the general public in the United States under T-Mobile; AT&T released it on November 22. A new white version of the Bold 9700 was hinted at by Research In Motion (RIM)'s Thai website, which posted an image of that version. On April 7, 2010, it was exclusively released on T-Mobile Netherlands. It was first released in North America by operator Rogers Communications in Canada, followed by its first release in the United States by T-Mobile, in May 2010, at a retail price of $100 with a contract. The AT&T release occurred on the 26th of that month. A special "Team Canada" edition of the Bold 9700 was also given to Future Shop employees once they reached a certain number of sales.

== Features ==
=== Hardware ===
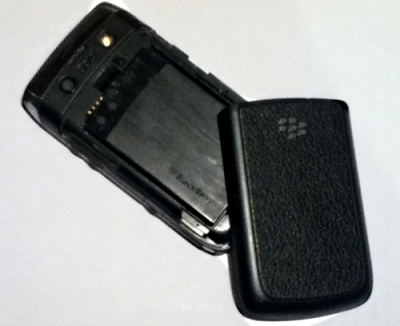
The Bold 9700 without its battery cover

The smartphone considerably reduces its predecessor's sizes, measuring 4.3 by 2.4 by 6 inches (10.92, 6.09 and 15.24 centimeters, respectively). The Bold 9700 has a 624 MHz processor and a 256MB Flash memory. The device uses a 2.44 inch HVGA (approximately 6.1 cm) non-touch LCD at a resolution of 480×360 pixels. The resolution of the display was compared to that of HTC Magic, as it has also HVGA quality. The model changes its predecessor's trackball to an optical trackpad, with simple functionalities such as swiping the thumb to move it and press it to make a selection. This change prevented problems including the accumulation of dust behind the trackball. Similarly to previous BlackBerry models, BlackBerry 9700 has a 35-key QWERTY-type physical keyboard, which is smaller than that of Bold 9000. On the top of the device, there are two buttons that respectively lock or mute it; on the right side of it, rubberized keys are found, which can either control the audio volume or the music player; further down, there is a camera shutter key. Cosmetic changes including the addition of a leatherette battery cover were carried out in order to appeal to both sexes.

The 3.2-megapixels camera is accompanied by a LED flash, and allows autofocusing and video recording. More features include a microSD slot and a headphone port. Regarding its connectivity, the BlackBerry Bold 9700 has support for 3G HSDPA networks and integrates Wi-Fi and GPS. The T-Mobile version of the Bold 9700 supports UMA technology—unlicensed mobile access, which allows making voice calls with a Wi-Fi network and not just with a cellular network.

=== Software ===
Upon release, the smartphone came with version 5 of BlackBerry's operating system, the BlackBerry OS. For the Bold 9700, the system came with upgrades, specifically for Messaging, Calendar and Browser applications; support for BlackBerry Enterprise Server (BES) and BlackBerry Internet Service, the latter allowing having up to 10 personal or business-oriented POP3 or IMAP4 e-mail accounts registered. The software also comes with "personal information management tools" and pre-loaded applications, such as a calculator, a clock, a task list and Documents To Go; along with more downloads found in BlackBerry World (then BlackBerry App World), though extra applications can only be downloaded to the smartphone's main memory and not to the microSD memory card. The phone's browser contains a faster JavaScript and enabled CSS processing, which allows faster page loading; it also supports widgets, streaming and Google Gears. The device also features speed dialing. The media player, which has basic functionalities such as searching, creating playlists and shuffle and repeat modes, supports MP3, WMA, WMA ProPlus, AAC, AAC+ and eAAC+ songs; it also plays MPEG4, WMV, and H.264 video files which can be played in a full-screen mode. Users' personal libraries can be synced from desktop/laptop media players through BlackBerry Media Sync.

An updated version of the operating system, BlackBerry 6, was announced by Research In Motion on August 3, 2010. It was initially announced for the Bold 9700, Bold 9650 and Pearl 3G models, while it debuted on the BlackBerry Torch smartphone. It improves several functionalities of BlackBerry 5, such as: icons on the home screen are arranged in five different views, which the user can view separately by swiping the trackpad; a search tool ("Universal Search"); an improved web browser, based on layout engine software WebKit, which contains diverse tabs that can be open simultaneously; pre-loaded social networking apps and enabling "rich content" on text messages, which are displayed in a chat-like format. It was released by T-Mobile on March 4, 2011; AT&T released it for Bold 9700 and Curve 3G models on April 29, 2011;

== Critical reception ==
Gareth Beavis of TechRadar awarded the smartphone four stars out of five. He pointed out that users who would upgrade to the phone from its predecessor could experience difficulties with typing, due to the reduced size of the keyboard, which he called "a little cramped for ‘his taste’". Beavis stated that he liked its "solid build quality[, which] cradles a battery with unrivalled lasting ability", the screen quality and the new optical trackpad. However, he opined that the device "still feels like the BlackBerrys of old" and felt it needed to be upgraded, along with its software features. Laura June from Engadget said that the "device feels nice in the hand" due to the "smaller, more sleek form factor of the whole package". Unlike Beavis from TechRadar, she felt "typing on [the keyboard] is a joy", while she agreed that "the larger-handed among us [could feel] pretty cramped". She wrote:

And, at the end of the day, that's one thing we can't get past—serious BlackBerry enthusiasts will tell you that the interface is doing just fine, and there are plenty of reasons to get hooked on these devices. For us, however, the BlackBerry UI is showing its age, and ultimately, beautiful hardware aside, this device is essentially exactly the same as every other BlackBerry.

Digital Trends' Nick Mokey referred to the Bold 9700 as a "recommended product". Awarding it four stars out of five, he stated that the overall "solid feel of the phone helps" stand out an "overall aura of quality". He found that the keyboard was "bordering on too small", although he named it the "finest" keyboard that can be "fold[ed] into a space this size". He also called the screen "amazing" and its call voice quality "excellent". Concluding the review, Mokey compared the smartphone to a Curve 8900 with a better battery, keyboard, a trackpad and what was missing on that phone—3G Internet coverage. He wrote: "Although the Bold 9700 lacks the frills of an iPhone or Palm Pre, for utilitarian business users, it’s one of the most polished smartphones on the market today."

Jamie Lendino and Sascha Segan from PC Magazine, who respectively reviewed the AT&T and T-Mobile versions, gave the smartphone a rating of four out of five points. The former described the Bold 9700 as "powerful, comfortable, and even somewhat chic" and its keyboard as "comfortable, quiet, and accurate". Emphasizing the quality of the voice calls, Lendino wrote they were "crisp, clear, and with plenty of gain in both direction". She regarded the web browser as "poor", noting that some pages take more than one minute to fully load; she also claimed the video playback was problematic. Sascha Segan named it "evolutionary, not revolutionary", having a similar opinion to Lendino though remarking that the video player ran with no problems and emphasizing the photo camera power.
