= BlackBerry Tour =

Wireless device developed by BlackBerry Limited, introduced in 2009

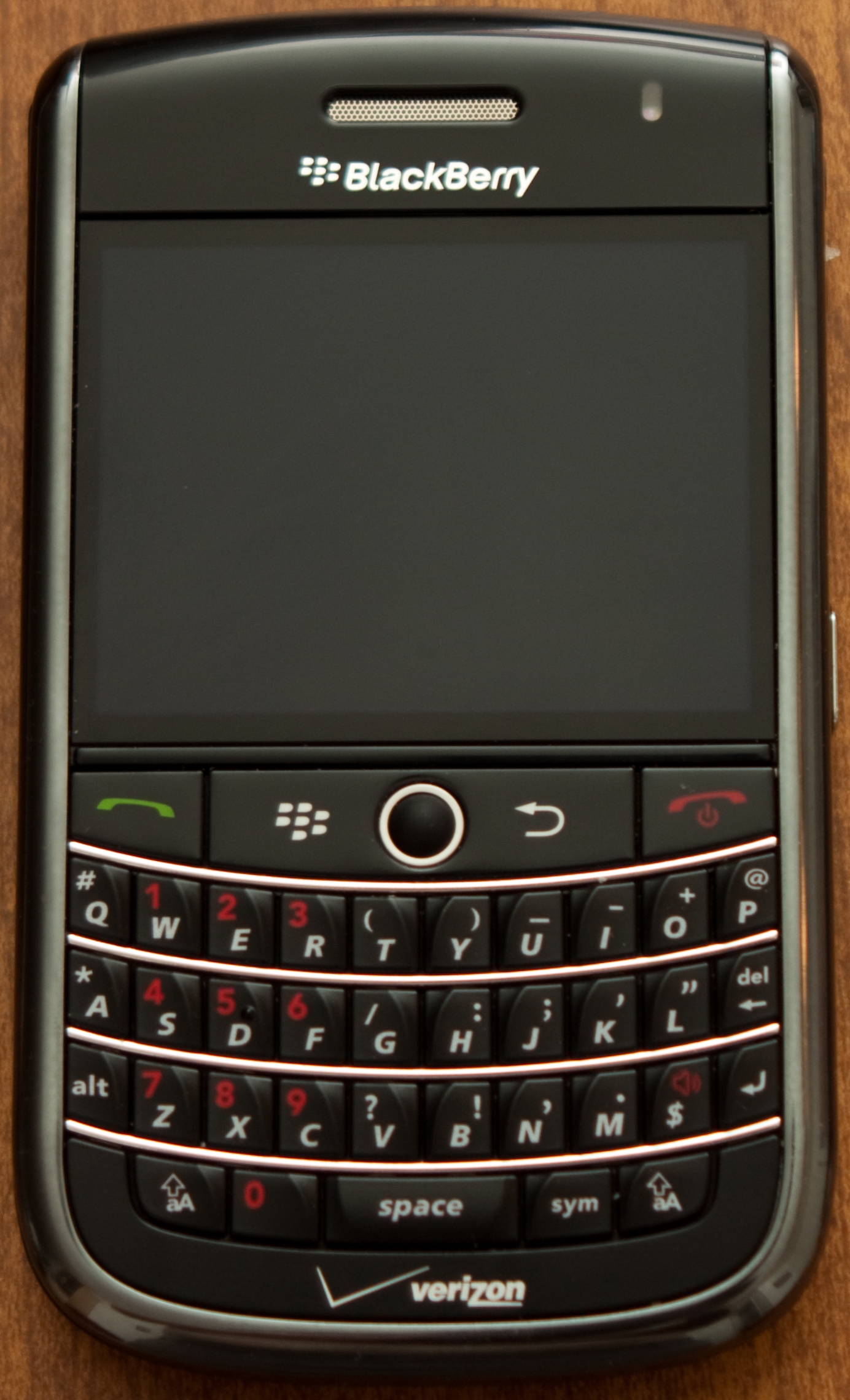
- A Verizon version of the BlackBerry Tour.
- Manufacturer: Research In Motion
- Availability by region: July 12, 2009 (Verizon Wireless); July 12, 2009 (Sprint); July 15, 2009 (Telus); July 9, 2009 (Bell Mobility); August 20, 2009 (Alltel); October 27, 2009 (U.S. Cellular)
- Successor: BlackBerry Bold 9650
- Related: BlackBerry Bold
- Compatible networks: CDMA2000/EV-DO Rev. A 800/1900 MHz; UMTS/HSPA: 2100 MHz; GSM/GPRS/EDGE: 850/900/1800/1900MHz
- Form factor: Candybar smartphone
- Weight: 130 g (4.6 oz)
- Operating system: BlackBerry OS 5.0
- CPU: Qualcomm MSM7600 at 528 MHz
- Memory: 128 MB SDRAM
- Storage: 256 MB Flash memory
- Removable storage: 2 GB microSD card included; expandable up to 16 GB
- Rear camera: 3.2 MP
- Display: 480×360 half VGA, 2.4" (built on 100μm pixel)
- Connectivity: Bluetooth 2.0
- Data inputs: Trackball, keyboard
- Development status: Discontinued (2011)

The BlackBerry Tour is a consumer smartphone developed by BlackBerry Limited (known at the time as Research In Motion) and is part of the 9600 device series. This high-end messaging phone combines the multimedia features of the Curve with the global roaming of the 8830 (with the addition of North American GSM / GPRS / EDGE capability), plus a higher-resolution display, 3.2 megapixel auto-focus camera, overseas 3G data and faster EVDO Rev. A data in the United States and Canada. Other key features include voice calling, video capture, a 3.5mm audio jack, a microSD slot, push email, a QWERTY keyboard, Bluetooth, and GPS navigation. The BlackBerry Tour was released on July 12, 2009. In 2010, the 'Tour 2' refresh was re-branded as the Blackberry Bold 9650 when RIM decided to merge the GSM and CDMA2000 variants under the same brand.

== Specifications ==
The BlackBerry 9630 has the following features:

- 256 MB internal flash memory
- 3.2 Megapixel camera with flash (available without camera)
- aGPS - internal assisted GPS with extended ephemeris, BlackBerry Maps as standard
- MP3/WMA/AAC+ media player
- DivX/WMV/XViD/3GP video player
- Bluetooth v2.0, Bluetooth Stereo Audio via A2DP and AVRCP
- Browser - HTML browsing; view movies / video clips from websites built for mobile streaming; RSS feed support
- BlackBerry OS 5.0

Research In Motion (RIM) released BlackBerry OS 5.0 for the Tour in North America in April 2010, with the following improvements:

- All BlackBerry Internet Service (BIS) devices running OS 5.0 received an updated Web browser with more accurate AJAX rendering, faster JavaScript processing and BlackBerry Widgets support, including Google Gears and SQLite.
- Companies running BlackBerry Enterprise Server 5.0 - originally released in May 2009 - saw several additional improvements on OS 5.0-equipped devices. They included follow-up flags for email messages; email folder management; the ability to view, edit, save or email documents from remote file shares; calendar appointment forwarding and attachment viewing; and wireless contact sync for multiple folders, distribution lists, and public and shared folder contacts.
- BlackBerry Messenger (BBM) 5.0
- Email and text messages with a stationary date header
- Threaded text messaging
- When sending pictures via email, MMS or BBM, an option to resize them to 1024×768, 800×600 or 640×480 was given.
- Forwarding calendar entries
- Updated BlackBerry Maps
- Users could set their default download folder, wallpaper, theme and reset the icon layout of a theme to its default layout from 'Homescreen Preferences'.
- If the device was running low on memory, a message would pop up that not only informed the user, but also recommended rarely used apps for deletion
- Users could decide whether to hear sounds when the device was booting up, shutting off, plugged in to charge, unplugged from charging, and when the battery was full or drained.
- Users could individually encrypt email PIN messages. The sender and receiver need to know the S/MIME encryption password.

== Last officially released 5.0 operating systems ==
- Telus: 5.0.0.419
- SaskTel: 5.0.0.419
- MTS Mobility: 5.0.0.419
- Sprint: 5.0.0.1030
- Verizon Wireless: 5.0.0.975

== Critical reception ==
CNET's Bonnie Cha criticised the BlackBerry Tour for lacking Wi-Fi and for not allowing applications to be downloaded to the memory card, but also praised its high-resolution display and QWERTY keyboard and concluded that it was a 'feature-rich and well-performing smartphone'.
