= Docomo STYLE series P-05B =

Mobile phone

docomo STYLE series P-05B
- Brand: NTT Docomo
- Manufacturer: Panasonic Mobile Communications
- Type: Feature phone
- Series: Docomo Style Series
- First released: June 24, 2010; 16 years ago
- Compatible networks: 3G: FOMA (W-CDMA) (800 MHz, 2 GHz); 2G: GSM (900 MHz, 1800 MHz, 1900 MHz)
- Form factor: Clamshell
- Colors: Jubilee Stripe; White; Pink Gold; Magenta
- Dimensions: 113 mm (4.4 in) H 50 mm (2.0 in) W 15.4 mm (0.61 in) D
- Weight: 137 g (4.8 oz)
- Operating system: Access Linux Platform + MOAP(L)
- Removable storage: microSD (up to 2 GB) microSDHC (up to 16 GB)
- Battery: 960 mAh
- Rear camera: 8.1 megapixel CMOS, AF, image stabilization, face recognition, f/2.8 28 mm wide-angle lens
- Front camera: None
- Display: Main: 3.0 in (76 mm) OLED, 240×427 px (Full Wide QVGA), 262,144 colors Sub: 0.8 in (20 mm) OLED, 96×25 px, 11,340 colors
- Model: P-05B

The docomo STYLE series P-05B is a 3G FOMA mobile phone terminal developed by Panasonic Mobile Communications for NTT Docomo. It is part of the docomo Style Series.

== History ==
On May 18, 2010, NTT Docomo announced the development and upcoming release of several models, including the P-05B alongside the F-06B, F-07B, F-08B, L-04B, N-04B, N-05B, N-06B, N-07B, N-08B, P-04B, P-06B, P-07B, SH-02B marimekko, SH-07B, SH-08B, SH-09B, LYNX SH-10B, dynapocket T-01B, and BlackBerry Bold 9700. Sales of the P-05B officially began on June 24, 2010.

== Specifications ==
=== Hardware ===
Targeted primarily at women in their 20s and 30s, the P-05B features a mirror-finish outer surface (except on the Jubilee Stripe variant), an organic EL color sub-display, and a two-white LED and one-color LED "Twinkle Illumination" system that lights up when receiving calls or closing the handset. Four color options were made available, including "Jubilee Stripe," a collaboration model with New York fashion brand kate spade. This marked the first fashion brand collaboration for a Panasonic mobile phone, featuring the signature stripe pattern of the brand. The collaboration unit shipped in dedicated packaging containing exclusive mini-bags and a card with a QR code providing access to exclusive wallpaper downloads.

=== Battery ===
The handset includes a 960 mAh battery delivering approximately 750 hours of continuous standby time and around 240 minutes of continuous voice talk time (160 minutes for video call). It features an "Auto Eco Mode" that automatically switches the device to power-saving mode when battery capacity drops below a pre-set threshold. Eco mode can also be toggled manually by long-pressing the "5" key.

=== Display ===
The primary display is a 3.0-inch Full Wide QVGA OLED display capable of showing 262,144 colors. The 0.8-inch OLED sub-display shows 11,340 colors, supports 7 text color selections and 4 clock display patterns, and incorporates "Happy Illumination" animations synced with the exterior lights when closed.

=== Connectivity ===
Connectivity includes 3G FOMA HSDPA (up to 7.2 Mbps download, 2.0 Mbps upload) and 2G GSM roaming via WORLD WING. The unit integrates Osaifu-Keitai (FeliCa), i-concier, infrared communication, and 1-seg TV broadcasting featuring a 60 fps frame rate display via "Mobile W Speed." It lacks GPS, Bluetooth, and support for i-appli Online, i-appli Touch, or iBodymo services.

=== Camera ===
The rear camera uses an 8.1-megapixel CMOS sensor with a 28 mm wide-angle lens, featuring quick startup (~0.7 seconds) and rapid autofocus (~0.2 seconds). Features include "Intelligent Auto" scene selection (adding beach, food, snow, sunset, and text to standard preset modes), high-sensitivity shooting up to ISO 12800 equivalent, "Smile Shutter," "Love Shutter," "Group Shutter," continuous 8-frame capture ("Omakase Choice"), picture categorization, and image processing powered by UniPhier. The device lacks an internal front-facing camera, requiring users to utilize the rear camera for video calling self-view.

=== Software ===
The device runs on the Access Linux Platform combined with MOAP(L). It includes an "Auto Eco Mode" power-saving option triggered by low battery levels, along with customized illumination settings featuring 43 distinct patterns. The camera software includes intelligent scene recognition, image stabilization, high-sensitivity shooting up to ISO 12,800 equivalent, face detection features such as "Smile Shutter" and "Love Shutter", and image processing powered by UniPhier. Pre-installed applications include G-Guide Program Guide Remote Control, Mobile Google Maps, iD setting app, DCMX credit app, Mobile Suica, and various game demos.

== Known issues ==
Software updates were released to resolve the following issues:

- October 13, 2010: Fixed an issue where an error could appear when attempting to take photos, preventing the camera from operating.
- February 27, 2014: Fixed an issue where images were occasionally rendered during browser navigation despite the i-mode browser image display setting being set to "Do not display.
