= BlackBerry Storm 2 =

Touchscreen smartphone

- Manufacturer: Research In Motion Ltd
- Type: Candybar smartphone
- Released: October 28, 2009 (Verizon)
- Operating system: BlackBerry OS 5.0
- CPU: Qualcomm MSM7627
- Storage: Flash memory: 256 MB application memory; 2 GB onboard device memory; microSDHC slot: supports up to 32 GB
- Display: 360 x 480 px, 3.25 in (83 mm), HVGA, 65,536 color LCD
- Input: Multi-touch touchscreen display with haptic feedback, volume controls, proximity and ambient light sensors, 3-axis accelerometer
- Camera: 3.2 megapixel with video, flash, and autofocus
- Connectivity: Wi-Fi (802.11b/g), Bluetooth 2.1+EDR, Micro-USB, A-GPS; Quad band GSM 850 900 1800 1900 MHz GPRS/EDGE and Uni band UMTS/HSDPA 2100 MHz; CDMA version (9550) adds: Dual band CDMA2000/EV-DO Rev. A 800 1900 MHz
- Power: 3.7 V 1400 mAh; Internal rechargeable removable lithium-ion battery Talk time: Up to 300 min (GSM), 330 min (CDMA), or 360 min (UMTS)
- Dimensions: 112.5 mm (4.43 in) (h); 62.2 mm (2.45 in) (w); 13.95 mm (0.549 in) (d)
- Weight: 165 g (5.8 oz)
- Predecessor: BlackBerry Storm
- Successor: BlackBerry Torch 9860

The BlackBerry Storm 2 is the second full touchscreen smartphone developed by Research In Motion.

== Introduction ==
The BlackBerry Storm 2 was the first smartphone in the world to have a full clickable touchscreen powered by its piezoelectric sensors underneath the screen. Unlike the original Storm, the Storm 2 featured Wi-Fi as well as a redesigned outer shell.

The phone's codename throughout development was "Odin." The model number was 9520 for the GSM/UMTS/HSPA (Mistakenly marked as CDMA) model offered by Vodafone and 9550 for the CDMA/EV-DO and UMTS/HSPA model offered by Verizon. The Storm 2 came with 2GB of on-board flash memory — 1GB more than the original — and was bundled with a 16GB microSD card (though not by Vodafone). The phone was a reasonable commercial success.

When comparing the Storm 2 with the original Storm, users found the Storm 2 more user friendly. The new touchscreen allowed users to type at a faster pace due to multi-touch support, similar to iPhone and many Android-based devices.

== Hardware ==
RIM released specifications on the phone, reporting that 256 MB of RAM is available for applications, doubling that of the original Storm. One major change is that the method of input, SurePress, has been redesigned. Instead of one physical button that lies in the direct center of the screen, the Storm 2 has four piezoelectric sensors located on the four outer corners of the screen that allow for confirmation of input. The screen does not depress when the device is locked or off. It ships with BlackBerry 5.0 OS. The phone's SureType screen, which was heavily criticized on the original Storm, has been revamped and improved.

The Storm 2 also supports OpenGL ES.

== SIM lock ==
The BlackBerry Storm 2 by default is SIM locked in many regions of the world, and can be subsequently unlocked on both the 9520 and 9550 to use on any GSM network if the code is obtained from the respective provider.

== Providers ==
- Bell Canada: Canada
- Celcom: Malaysia
- Maxis Communications: Malaysia
- SaskTel: Canada
- O_{2}: United Kingdom
- T-Mobile: Croatia, United Kingdom
- Telus: Canada
- Verizon Wireless: United States
- Vodafone/Vodacom: Albania, Australia, Cyprus, Croatia, France, Germany, Ireland, Greece, Italy, the Netherlands, Portugal, Spain, South Africa, United Kingdom and India
- 3: Australia
- Trigcom: Norway
- Iusacell: Mexico
- SK Telecom: South Korea
