= BlackBerry Storm =

Defunct touchscreen smartphone

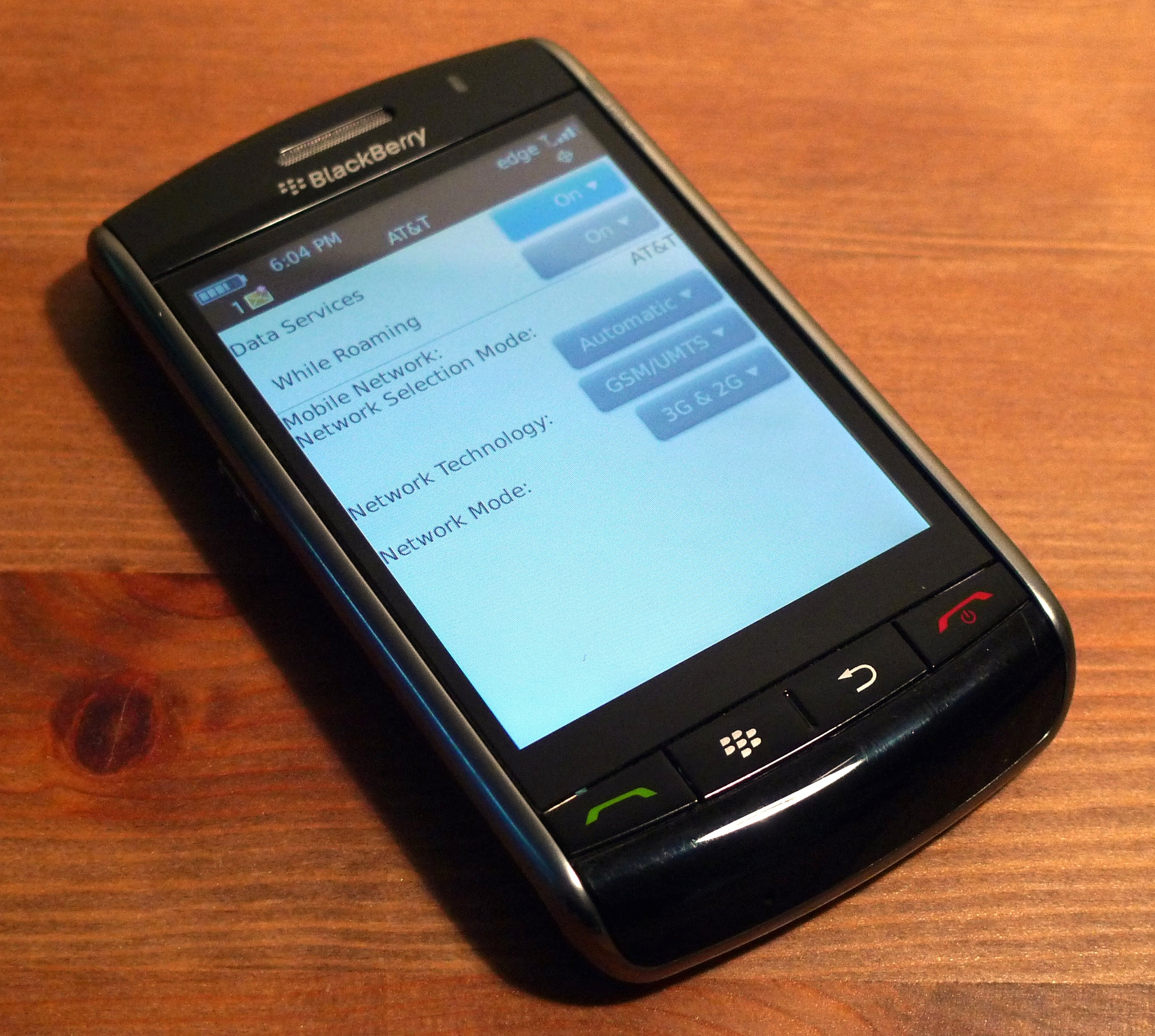
- Manufacturer: Research In Motion Ltd
- Availability by region: November 14, 2008 (UK); November 21, 2008 (U.S.); December 4, 2008 (Australia); December 11, 2008 (Canada)
- Successor: BlackBerry Storm 2
- Form factor: Candybar smartphone
- Dimensions: 112.5 mm (4.43 in) (h); 62.2 mm (2.45 in) (w); 13.95 mm (0.549 in) (d)
- Weight: 155 g (5.5 oz)
- Operating system: BlackBerry OS 5.0.0.419
- CPU: 528 MHz Qualcomm processor
- Storage: Flash memory: 128 MB application memory; 1 GB device memory; microSDHC slot: supports up to 32 GB
- Battery: 3.7 V 1400 mAh; Internal rechargeable removable lithium-ion battery Talk time: 330 min Standby time: 360 hours
- Rear camera: 3.2 megapixel with video at 480 x 352 px, flash, and autofocus
- Display: 360 x 480 px, 3.25 in (83 mm), HVGA, 65,536 color LCD
- Connectivity: Bluetooth 2.0+EDR, Micro-USB, A-GPS, Quad band GSM 850 900 1800 1900 MHz GPRS/EDGE and Uni band UMTS/HSDPA 2100 MHz; CDMA version (9530) adds: Dual band CDMA2000/EV-DO Rev. A 800 1900 MHz
- Data inputs: Multi-touch touchscreen display with haptic feedback, volume controls, proximity and ambient light sensors, 3-axis accelerometer
- Hearing aid compatibility: M3

The BlackBerry Storm is a high-end touchscreen smartphone developed by Research In Motion, announced on October 7, 2008 and first released in November 2008. A part of the BlackBerry 9500 series of phones, it was RIM's first touchscreen device, and its first without a physical keyboard.

Developed as a response to Apple's iPhone, RIM built a haptic feedback technology known as SurePress, designed to mimic a tactile physical keyboard by clicking the screen and its mechanical switches underneath. It features a 3.25" LCD display with a 480x360 resolution, and 185 ppi that was very sharp at the time it was marketed. RIM designed the BlackBerry Storm to be a "world phone" capable of working with 3G EV-DO networks as well as GSM/HSDPA globally, although it lacked Wi-Fi.

Although the phone sold well, partly due to a strong push by American carrier Verizon, it became notorious for sluggish hardware and software. Typing was considered difficult to long time BlackBerry users and its BlackBerry OS software, which was based on Java ME architecture and not purpose-made for touchscreens, was buggy. Many Storms sold to Verizon customers were returned because of the mechanical failure of the SurePress as well as a broken accelerometer and constant software crashes. Retrospectively it has been considered a disastrous commercial product and a major factor in RIM's decline in North America.

== Development ==
‘I couldn’t type on it and I still can’t type on it, and a lot of my friends can’t type on it. . . . It’s hard to type on piece of glass.’

— Larry Conlee, Research In Motion COO, about the iPhone

The BlackBerry Storm was made under the leadership of Research In Motion's co-CEO Mike Lazaridis. The device was codenamed Project Storm. The plan was to outdo Apple by utilizing BlackBerry's well-noted keyboard with the "lure" of touchscreens. A prototype of the Storm was shown to executives from carriers Verizon and Vodafone at a hotel meeting in August 2007, a meeting in which the main presentation was the new BlackBerry Bold. According to Lazaridis, after the Verizon and Vodafone staff used the Storm: “They were over the moon. [..] “They loved the prototype. They called it revolutionary.”

Gaining support from the carriers and a high expectation agreement, RIM went to develop this into a finished retail product. However, although it normally took 18 months to develop a new BlackBerry, RIM decided to rush the Storm project to have it released to the carriers and customers in only 9 months. Some internal engineers expressed doubt after the project was revealed to them, but Lazaridis was confident in the team after the successful BlackBerry Pearl project.

== Hardware ==
The Storm utilizes the MSM7600 from Qualcomm, a dual core CPU with ARM11 400 MHz and ARM9 274 MHz. The device features 1 GB of onboard memory, 128 MB of NVRAM and an expandable memory slot support for a microSD card of up to an additional 32 GB. Verizon Wireless, Bell Mobility and Telus Mobility include a preinstalled 8 GB microSD card on board.

=== Screen and input ===
The Storm featured a 3.25 in (8.3 cm) TFT-LCD capacitive touchscreen with 360x480 pixel resolution, able to display 65,536 colours. The screen also incorporated technology developed by RIM known as SurePress, which allows the screen to press down like a button to provide physical feedback.

By default, the Storm uses a virtual keyboard implementing the SureType predictive text system used by other Blackberry phones when held vertically, switching to a QWERTY keyboard when held horizontally. Newer versions of the Blackberry OS for the Storm allow the use of the QWERTY keyboard when held vertically. Firmware package 4.7.0.203 (Verizon Wireless) removes the predictive text feature from the multi-tap keyboard configuration; the feature was reinstated in later updates. There have been reviews on reports of screen difficulties such as freezing and wrong buttons loading.

The device features a built-in 3.2 megapixel camera located on back which features a flash, autofocus, and has video recording capabilities with a maximum resolution of 480 x 352 pixels. It was the first BlackBerry device that could record video.

=== Connectivity ===
The Storm supports CDMA with EV-DO Rev. A data, UMTS with HSDPA, and quad-band GSM with EDGE data access speed. The BlackBerry Storm 9500 has a firmware-disabled CDMA module and is destined for use outside North America. However, the BlackBerry Storm only has European, Oceania, Asia and Brazil UMTS and HSDPA frequency bands. Therefore, if the BlackBerry Storm is used with GSM wireless carriers in North America, the BlackBerry Storm will only be able to access wireless internet at EDGE data speed maximum. This is because GSM carriers in North America, namely AT&T, T-Mobile, Rogers and Fido do not operate on the same frequency bands for 3G as the rest of the world. If BlackBerry Storm is used in Europe, Africa, Asia, Oceania or Brazil, HSDPA wireless data speed can be achieved, provided that the local GSM network supports it. The phone will use the primary network technology of its intended carrier (Verizon) when traveling domestically in the US, and rely upon the GSM/UMTS/HSDPA networks of Vodafone mainly when traveling abroad. There are currently no unlocked and unbranded versions available for the GSM Blackberry Storm; however unlocking the phone will allow it to be used with any GSM service provider. The device also supports Bluetooth v2.0, Bluetooth Stereo Audio via A2DP and AVRCP.

== Software ==
=== Supported media formats ===
File Format / Extension	Component	Codec	Notes	RTSP Streaming
MP4 M4A 3GP 3GP2	Video	H.264	Baseline Profile, 480x360 pixels, up to 2 Mbit/s, 30 frames per second	Supported
MP4 M4A 3GP 3GP2	Video	MPEG4	Simple Profile Level 3, 480x360 pixels, up to 2 Mbit/s, 30 frames per second	Supported
MP4 M4A 3GP 3GP2	Video	H.263	Profile 0 and 3, Level 30	Supported
MP4 M4A 3GP 3GP2	Audio	AAC-LC, AAC+, eAAC+		Supported
MP4 M4A 3GP 3GP2	Audio	AMR-NB		Supported
MP4 M4A 3GP 3GP2	Audio	QCELP EVRC		
AVI	Video	MPEG4	Simple Profile Level 3, 480x360 pixels, up to 2 Mbit/s, 30 frames per second	Supported
AVI	Audio	MP3		
ASF WMV WMA	Video	Windows Media Video 9	WMV3, Simple Profile, 480x360 pixels, 30 frames per second	
ASF WMV WMA	Audio	Windows Media Audio 9		Supported
ASF WMV WMA	Audio	Windows Media 10 Standard/Professional		Supported
MP3	Audio	MP3		

=== Firmware updates ===
Firmware updates were released after December 2008 that addressed most of the critic's issues; updates can be downloaded online or over-the-air, and can be installed by the user. The current software is:

Device	Carrier	Package Version	Applications	Software Platform
BlackBerry Storm 9530	MTS Mobility	5.0.0.808	5.0.0.419	4.2.0.179
BlackBerry Storm 9530	Verizon Wireless	5.0.0.328	5.0.0.328	4.2.0.128
BlackBerry Storm 9530	Telus Mobility	5.0.0.419	5.0.0.419	4.2.0.179
BlackBerry Storm 9530	Bell Mobility	5.0.0.419	5.0.0.419	4.2.0.179
BlackBerry Storm 9530	Iusacell	4.7.0.208	4.7.0.151	4.0.0.186
BlackBerry Storm 9500	Vodafone Australia	5.0.0.742	5.0.0.451	4.2.0.198

== Availability ==
The BlackBerry Storm was available through Vodafone in the UK, Germany, France (SFR), Italy, Ireland, Australia, South Africa (Vodacom), The Netherlands and India; Verizon Wireless in the United States; Telus, Bell, and SaskTel in Canada, on Iusacell in Mexico, and on LIME and Digicel in parts of the Caribbean.

The BlackBerry Storm 9530 was an international communication device featuring CDMA technology with EV-DO Rev. A data support, as well as UMTS with HSDPA and quad-band GSM with EDGE data access speeds. In contrast, the BlackBerry Storm 9500 lacks the CDMA module and is designed for use outside of North America. However, it only supports UMTS and HSDPA frequency bands for Europe, Oceania, Asia, and Brazil. This means that if the BlackBerry Storm is used with GSM wireless carriers in North America—such as AT&T, T-Mobile, Rogers, and Fido—it will only be able to access wireless internet at a maximum speed of EDGE. This limitation arises because GSM carriers in North America operate on different frequency bands for 3G than those used in the rest of the world.

When used in Europe, Africa, Asia, Oceania, or Brazil, the BlackBerry Storm can achieve HSDPA wireless data speeds, provided that the local GSM network supports it. Domestically in the US, the phone will utilize the primary network technology of its intended carrier (Verizon) and will rely on the GSM/UMTS/HSDPA networks of Vodafone when traveling abroad. Currently, there are no unlocked or unbranded versions of the GSM BlackBerry Storm available; however, unlocking the phone will allow it to be used with any GSM service provider.

=== SIM lock ===
The BlackBerry Storm by default is SIM locked, and can be subsequently unlocked on both the 9500 & 9530 Storm editions to use on any GSM network if the code is obtained from the respective provider. The 9530 is not compatible with AT&T Mobility's 3G UMTS/HSDPA network because its UMTS transceiver only works at 2.1 GHz which is a frequency not used in the United States for UMTS, but the BlackBerry Storm will still work over the slower EDGE network in the United States and respective EDGE network from Rogers Communications in Canada.

== Reception ==
=== Sales and returns ===
The Blackberry Storm sold 500,000 units in its first month and 1 million units by January 2009. In the US heavily subsided by Verizon, it ended up being lowly priced and combined with BlackBerry's reputation meant that sales were good.

However, Verizon had to replace almost all of the one million Storm smartphones sold in 2008 due to issues with the SurePress touch screen as well as pocket lint and software crashes, and claimed $500 million in losses. This was troubling for RIM as prior to 2008, BlackBerry devices had extremely low return rates. Jim Balsillie retrospectively, in 2012, even went as far as saying that the Storm had a "100% return rate". However, Gizmodo noted that 2008-2009 sources claimed a rate of as high as 50% instead, or just 10% when quoted directly from Verizon.

Its competitors included Apple's iPhone, the Palm Pre, the T-Mobile G1 by HTC and the HTC Touch family.

=== Critical reception ===
The Storm was met with generally mixed reviews, some focusing on serious usability problems in particular. Many gadget reviewers, including Bonnie Cha of CNET, Joshua Topolsky of Engadget and Sascha Segan from PC Magazine, noted the Storm's much-improved web browser and impressive call quality, while also deeming the SurePress touchscreen difficult to learn and a hindrance to fast typing. Several reviews also noted that the web browser was still unable to handle complex webpages correctly, saying that the iPhone's Safari is a better mobile browser. A number of reviewers also ran into multiple software glitches during their testing, such as lockups, sluggish performance and refusal to switch orientation.

The lack of Wi-Fi support also irked a few reviewers, but Jeff Rauschert of MLive wrote that Verizon's wireless network somewhat made up for that. David Haskin of the Reseller News noted that BlackBerry's major business features, such as enterprise e-mail integration and Microsoft Office document editing capabilities, were on par with BlackBerry's previous offerings, noting that these features would likely make the Storm more popular with the business crowd.

David Pogue of the New York Times bashed the BlackBerry Storm calling it the BlackBerry Dud and said it was "head-bangingly frustrating", particularly for lacking Wi-Fi and being prone to too many glitches. Stephen Fry called the Storm "the Edsel of smartphones, an absolute smeller from top to bottom."

== Legacy ==
Despite the troubles of the product, RIM launched the BlackBerry Storm 2 in 2009. In a 2015 book, Losing the Signal: The Untold Story Behind the Extraordinary Rise and Spectacular Fall of BlackBerry, the authors argued that the Storm was the single biggest disaster in smartphone history. RIM's then co-CEO, Jim Balsillie, said to the authors of the book: "If Storm had worked, Verizon would never have done [Motorola] Droid. When we didn't do the job for Verizon, they gave the keys to the kingdom to Google."

Although the product didn't damage the company immediately, amid continuously high popularity of its traditional keyboard devices BlackBerry Bold and BlackBerry Curve (the best-selling smartphone in the United States in the first quarter of 2009) the failure of the Storm as well as its following corporate paralysis at RIM (between co-CEOs Balsillie and Mike Lazaridis) regarding the future smartphone strategy of the company, eventually led to Verizon's reactionary endorsement of the Motorola Droid and hence the end of RIM as the carrier's premium partner, leading to a decline in BlackBerry market share in 2010 and 2011 in favor of Android. Therefore the Storm is often cited as the catalyst.

In 2011, the smartphone market share of the BlackBerry in North America plummeted compared to 2010, RIM's stock price tanked, and the company's PlayBook tablet was a failure. In total contrast, the company had grown by this time in other markets where BlackBerry had a minor presence when the Storm was released: in 2011, BlackBerry was the most popular smartphone brand in the Netherlands and Great Britain, both amongst youth rather than corporate users, while in Spain it was also highly popular in this demographic and achieved the top spot nationally for prepaid phones in 2011. RIM also focused more on Latin American and Asian markets, achieving dominance in Indonesia as well as in South Africa as of 2012.
