= BlackBerry OS =

Operating system

- BlackBerry OS logo
- Developer: BlackBerry Limited
- Written in: Java, C++
- OS family: Mobile operating systems
- Working state: Discontinued (replaced by BlackBerry 10; and Android)
- Source model: Closed source
- Initial release: January 19, 1999; 27 years ago (as Version 1.0 for BlackBerry 850 pager); March 4, 2002; 24 years ago (as Version 3.6 for BlackBerry 5810 smartphone)
- Final release: 7.1.0.2931 (BlackBerry 9790/9900) / November 2013; 13 years ago
- Marketing target: Smartphone
- Available in: Multilingual
- Package manager: BlackBerry Desktop Manager
- Supported platforms: BlackBerry line of smartphones
- Kernel type: monolithic
- License: proprietary
- Succeeded by: BlackBerry 10
- Official website: http://us.blackberry.com/software/smartphones.html (Archive)

Support status
- Unsupported

BlackBerry OS is a discontinued proprietary mobile operating system developed by Canadian company Research In Motion (now BlackBerry Limited) for its BlackBerry line of smartphone handheld devices. The operating system provides multitasking and supports specialized input devices adopted by BlackBerry for use in its handhelds, particularly the QWERTY keyboard, trackwheel, trackball, and in later years, the trackpad and touchscreen.

Research from June 2011 indicated that approximately 45% of mobile developers were using the platform. BlackBerry OS was discontinued after the release of BlackBerry 10 in January 2013, and support for it ceased on January 4, 2022.

== Features ==
BlackBerry OS supported standard smartphone functionality with a focus on meeting the needs of corporate clients. These features included: push e-mail, mobile telephone, SMS & MMS messaging, internet faxing, and web browsing. Web browsing was supported through the Blackberry Browser. Updates to the operating system were automatically available from wireless carriers that supported the BlackBerry via an over the air update service.

The BlackBerry platform natively supports corporate email through Java Micro Edition MIDP 1.0 and later a subset of MIDP 2.0. This integration allowed for comprehensive wireless activation and synchronization with Microsoft Exchange, Lotus Domino, or Novell GroupWise, supporting push email, calendar, tasks, notes, and contacts when utilizing BlackBerry Enterprise Server. The operating system also supports WAP 2.0.

Third-party developers wrote software using the available BlackBerry API classes, although applications that made use of certain functionality needed to be digitally signed.

== Release history ==
Table of versions: BlackBerry
| Version | Release date | Features / Information about |
|---|---|---|
| 1 | January 1999; 27 years ago | Main article: BlackBerry 950 § RIM OS BlackBerry OS made its debut and was released for the BlackBerry 850 pager. |
| 4 | March 2002; 24 years ago | Released on the BlackBerry 5810 smartphone. First version to support Java applications. |
| 5.0 | August 4, 2009; 17 years ago | Released on the BlackBerry Bold 9000 and came to other BlackBerry smartphones a short while after. |
| 6.0 | Q3 2010 | In April 2010, BlackBerry Limited announced BlackBerry OS 6.0, which was released in the third quarter of 2010. This version marked a transformation of the BlackBerry Browser, featuring significant GUI enhancements and an engine transition to WebKit. |
| 7.0 | August 2011; 15 years ago | BlackBerry OS 7 featured various performance improvements (including use of "Liquid Graphics" technology to improve touchscreen performance), a "significantly enhanced" web browser (including HTML video support), voice-activated search, and "BlackBerry Balance"—a feature allowing personal and work-related content to be separated from each other on a single device. This version launched exclusively on new BlackBerry models concurrently announced, including the Bold 9900 and 9930, and Torch 9810 and 9860, among others, with BlackBerry Limited stating that it would not release updates for existing devices. |
| 7.1 | January 2012; 14 years ago | This was an update to 7.0 and added several new features compared to it, including: Ability to create a Wi-Fi hotspot; Support for Wi-Fi calling; FM radio support on the Curve; Blackberry Tag (sharing images using NFC); While it was later superseded by the BlackBerry 10 operating system, it remained available particularly on the BlackBerry 9720. |
| Version | Release date | Features / Information about |

=== BlackBerry 9720 ===
The BlackBerry 9720 runs a version of BlackBerry OS 7.1 with updates to the user interface that mimics BlackBerry 10, including a new lock screen, Application Switcher and Music, Pictures, Videos and Phone apps.

== Release Availability ==
While BlackBerry Limited developed and released updated versions of its operating system for each device, individual carriers decided if and when a version was released to their users.

BlackBerry OS has now reached end-of-life. Therefore, devices running it are no longer sold new.

| Version | Supported devices: BlackBerry 8000 series |
|---|---|
| 4.5 | BlackBerry devices in the 8100 and 8800 series, plus BlackBerry Curve 8300/8310/8320. |
| 4.6 | BlackBerry Pearl Flip. |
| 5.0 | BlackBerry Curve 8330/8350i/8520/8530/8900. |

| Version | Supported devices: BlackBerry 9000 series |
|---|---|
| 5.0 | BlackBerry Bold 9000, BlackBerry Storm, BlackBerry Storm 2 and BlackBerry Tour. |
| 6.0 | BlackBerry Bold 9650/9700/9780, BlackBerry Curve 9300/9330, BlackBerry Pearl 9100/9105, BlackBerry Style 9670 and BlackBerry Torch 9800. |
| 7.0 | BlackBerry Bold 9790/9900/9930, BlackBerry Curve 9350/9360/9370/9380 and BlackBerry Torch 9810/9850/9860. |
| 7.1 | BlackBerry Curve 9220/9310/9315/9320 and BlackBerry 9720. |

== BlackBerry fonts ==
The following is a list of fonts included in BlackBerry OS (some are not included in older versions):

- Andalé Mono
- Arial
- BBAlpha Sans
- BBAlpha Sans Condensed
- BBAlpha Serif
- BBCAPITALS
- BBCCasual
- BBClarity
- BBCondensed
- BBGlobal Sans
- BBGlobal Serif
- BBMillbank
- BBMillbank Tall
- BBSansSerif
- BBSansSerifSquare
- BBSerifFixed
- Comic Sans MS
- Courier New
- Georgia
- Impact
- Symbol
- Tahoma
- Times New Roman
- Trebuchet MS
- Verdana
- Webdings
- Wingdings

BBAlphaSans and BBAlphaSerif are based on the free software DejaVu fonts.

== BlackBerry Tablet OS ==
On September 27, 2010, BlackBerry Limited announced a new unrelated QNX-based platform, BlackBerry Tablet OS, to run on its BlackBerry PlayBook tablet computer.

== See also ==
- BlackBerry (company)
- BlackBerry 10
- Comparison of mobile operating systems
- Index of articles related to BlackBerry OS
- Usage share of operating systems
- List of BlackBerry products
