= Optical trackpad =

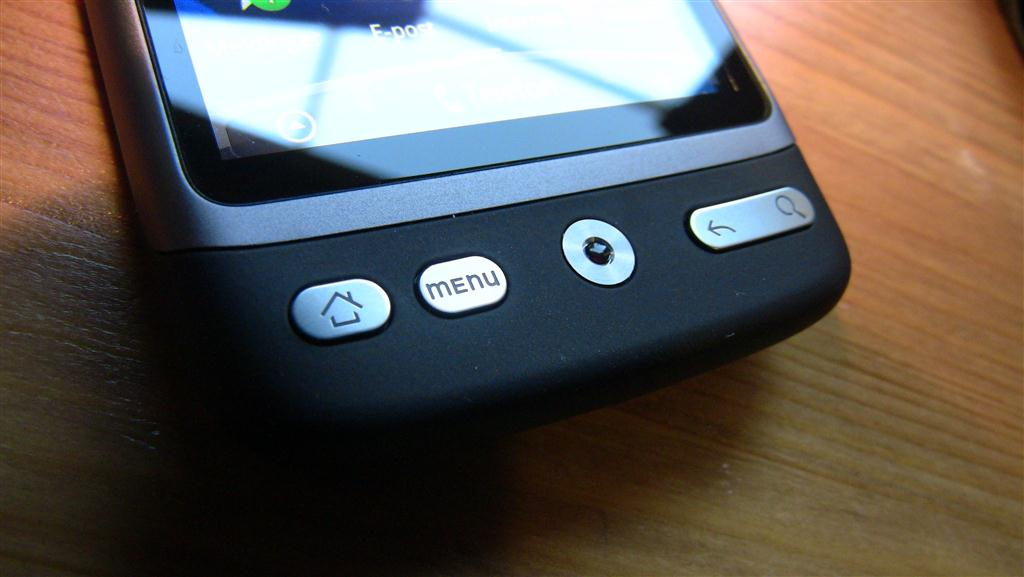
An optical trackpad on a HTC Desire, here, the silver disc in the center of the physical navigation bar of other buttons below the screen

An optical trackpad is an input device based on an optical sensor, which detects the displacement of a finger that is moving on top of it. The sensor is used typically in smartphones, where it replaces the D-pad, and in ultra-portable or ultra-mobile PCs, where it replaces touchpads, pointing sticks or trackballs as pointing device.

The main advantages over a D-pad are:

- It can track movements in 360 degrees and with varying speeds.
- It uses space efficiently, without the need for small buttons that are difficult to press.

Next to browsing through menus, it can drive a mouse cursor in point&click interfaces.

In comparison with touchpads, it detects actual skin displacement, instead of displacement of the center of the area being touched, and more similar to pointing sticks or compact trackballs by using experience, but with less physical feedback.

== See also ==
- Optical fingerprint sensor
