= List of BlackBerry products =

The following is a partial list of BlackBerry products. BlackBerry is a line of Wireless handheld devices first introduced in 1996 and manufactured by the Canadian company BlackBerry, formerly known as Research In Motion (RIM).

== Early pager models ==
These two-way pager models had thumb keyboards, with a thumbwheel for scrolling its monochrome text display. The first model, the Inter@ctive Pager, was announced on September 18, 1996. Within a year, Yankee Group was estimating that devices like the Inter@ctive Pager were in use by fewer than 400,000 people and expected two-way wireless messaging services to attract 51 million users by 2002.

They provided e-mail and WAP services, with limited HTML access provided via third-party software such as WolfeTech PocketGenie or GoAmerica browser.

They were built for use with two 1G data-only packet switched networks: Mobitex and DataTAC. They did not support Java without the use of a Java Virtual Machine add-on.

Family	Model	Release date	Photo	Screen	Network	Notes
85x	850	1999-01-19		132 × 65 pixels	DataTAC	
85x	857	2000-09-30		160 × 160 pixels	DataTAC	
95x	900	1996-09-17		132 × 65 pixels	Mobitex	
95x	950	1998-08-17	RIM 950	132 × 65 pixels	Mobitex	4MB of flash memory, was also sold with modified software as the AOL Mobile Communicator.
95x	957	2000-09-30	RIM 957	160 × 160 pixels	Mobitex	Also known as the "Proton"
95x	962	1998-08-25		132 × 65 pixels	Mobitex	2MB version of the Model 950

== Monochrome Java-based models (5000 and 6000 series) ==
Most of these models were the first BlackBerry models that had a built-in mobile phone, were the first models that natively ran Java, and transmitted data over the normal 2G cellular network. RIM began to advertise these devices as email-capable mobile phones rather than as two-way pagers. At this time, the primary market was still businesses rather than consumers.

The 5810 was released on March 4, 2002. An aberration in this list, the 5790, was released at a much later date as a niche model in 2004 after many color BlackBerry models were out. This non-phone BlackBerry was made available due to the demand for a Java-based model that could run on the Mobitex data-only network. The 5810/5820 shared the same physical casing and keyboard layout as the earlier 957 device.

The 6000 series was launched in 2003 with 6210 entering the influential Time All Time 100 Gadgets list.

Family	Model	Release date	Photo	Screen	Network	Notes
Specialty	5790	2004-10-25		large 160×160 pixel monochrome	900 MHz Mobitex	e-mail services only
Early Java-based	5810	2002-03-03		large monochrome screen 160×160 pixel	1900 MHz GSM/GPRS	phone but headset required
Early Java-based	5820	2002-03-03		large monochrome screen 160×160 pixel	900/1800 MHz GSM/GPRS	phone but headset required
"Quark"	6210	2003-03-11		medium 160×100 pixel monochrome	900/1900 MHz GSM/GPRS	integrated phone
"Quark"	6220	2003-03-11		medium 160×100 pixel monochrome	900/1800 MHz GSM/GPRS	integrated phone
"Quark"	6230	2003-06-02	BlackBerry 6230	medium 160×100 pixel monochrome	900/1800/1900 MHz GSM/GPRS	integrated phone
"Quark"	6280	2004-02-25		medium 160×100 pixel monochrome	850/1800/1900 MHz GSM/GPRS	integrated phone
65XX	6510	2002-12-2		medium monochrome	iDEN	integrated phone, integrated two-way radio
67XX	6710	2002-10-15		large monochrome 160×160 pixel	900/1900 MHz GSM/GPRS	integrated phone
67XX	6720	2002-10-15		large monochrome 160×160 pixel	900/1800 MHz GSM/GPRS	integrated phone
67XX	6750	2002-12-4		large monochrome 160×160 pixel	800/1900 MHz CDMA2000 1xRTT	integrated phone

== First color models (7000 series) ==
In 2003, the monochrome models were revised to include a color screen, while retaining the same form factor and casing. Early color models, such as the 7230, typically used a dim electroluminescent backlight, leading to an initial reputation of poor image quality. Later color models, such as the 7290, typically used a LED backlight, yielding much better screen quality. The color LCD screens used in these series were either reflective or transflective, so these screens yielded better image quality in direct sunlight even with the backlight turned off.

Nearly all models in this list were 16 MB models with no Bluetooth. The only model with 32 MB and Bluetooth is the 7290, which was the last model released in the early BlackBerry form factor, and was the first BlackBerry model with Bluetooth. The 7290 was also the first quad-band BlackBerry.

An aberration in this list is the 7270, the first Wi-Fi BlackBerry, released later. It is built into the old form factor in the same vein as the 7200 series.

Family	Model	Release date	Photo	Screen	Network	Notes
72XX	7210	2003-08-12		medium 240×160 pixel colour	900/1900 MHz GSM/GPRS	integrated phone
72XX	7220			medium 240×160 pixel colour	900/1800 MHz GSM/GPRS	integrated phone
72XX	7230	2003-06-01	BlackBerry 7230	medium 240×160 pixel colour	900/1800/1900 MHz GSM/GPRS	integrated phone
72XX	7250	2005-02-06		medium 240×160 pixel colour	800/1900 MHz CDMA2000 1x (EVDO-capable w/firmware update)	integrated phone, Bluetooth
72XX	7270	2005-02-06		medium 240×160 pixel colour		corporate WLAN 802.11b networks for data and VOIP
72XX	7280	2003-12-10		medium 240×160 pixel colour	850/1800/1900 MHz GSM/GPRS	integrated phone
72XX	7290	2004-09-27		medium 240×160 pixel colour	850/900/1800/1900 MHz GSM/GPRS	integrated phone with Bluetooth
75XX	7510	2004-01-05		medium 240×160 pixel colour	iDEN	integrated phone with speakerphone, integrated two-way radio
75XX	7520	2004-12-05		medium 240×160 pixel colour	iDEN	integrated phone with speakerphone, integrated two-way radio, GPS and Bluetooth
77XX	7730	2003-11-25	7730	large 240×240 pixel colour	900/1800/1900 MHz GSM/GPRS	integrated phone
77XX	7750	2004-03-21		large 240×240 pixel colour	800/1900 MHz CDMA2000 1x	integrated phone
77XX	7780	2004-05-31		large 240×240 pixel colour	850/1800/1900 MHz GSM/GPRS	integrated phone

== First SureType models (7100 series) ==
RIM expanded the market by introducing the first BlackBerry models without a discrete QWERTY keyboard, in the candybar form factor. They developed a predictive text technology called SureType with a QWERTY-like layout, using two keys per button. By using only two letters per button, rather than three letters per button as in T9 using ten-digit keypads, predictive text accuracy could be improved dramatically. The use of a QWERTY-like layout took advantage of people's memory of the computer keyboard, since each button was roughly relative to each key. At the same time, the size of the BlackBerry could be dramatically reduced, as keyboards only needed to be 5-buttons wide rather than 10-buttons wide. These BlackBerries became more popular with the mass market as they became similarly sized to competing consumer-market cellphones.

These models were among the first BlackBerry models to be aggressively marketed to consumers, rather than to businesses. RIM continued to manufacture QWERTY models, to give the market a choice between the traditional QWERTY thumb keyboard, and the compressed SureType keyboard.

Family	Model	Release date	Photo	Screen	Network	Notes	Carriers
"Charm"	7100t	2004-09-11		large 240×260 colour	850/900/1800/1900 MHz GSM/GPRS	with integrated phone with speakerphone, Bluetooth	Airtel, Vodafone, T-Mobile
"Charm"	7105t	2005-10-12		large 240×260 colour	850/900/1800/1900 MHz GSM/GPRS	with integrated phone with speakerphone, Bluetooth	Airtel, Vodafone, T-Mobile
"Charm"	7100r	2004-11-15		large 240×260 colour	850/900/1800/1900 MHz GSM/GPRS	with integrated phone with speakerphone, Bluetooth	Airtel, Vodafone, T-Mobile
"Charm"	7100v	2004-09-15		large 240×260 colour	850/900/1800/1900 MHz GSM/GPRS	with integrated phone with speakerphone, Bluetooth	Airtel, Vodafone, T-Mobile
"Charm"	7100g	2005-01-30		large 240×260 colour	850/900/1800/1900 MHz GSM/GPRS	with integrated phone with speakerphone, Bluetooth	Airtel, Vodafone, T-Mobile
"Charm"	7100x	2005-01-11		large 240×260 colour	850/900/1800/1900 MHz GSM/GPRS	with integrated phone with speakerphone, Bluetooth	O2 (UK), O2 (Ireland)
"Charm"	7100i	2005-10-13		large 240×260 colour	iDEN	with integrated phone with speakerphone, Bluetooth, Push-to-talk, GPS, 64MB	Nextel and Telus and SouthernLINC
7130	7130e	2005-11-20		large 240×260 colour	800/1900 MHz CDMA2000 1× and EV-DO	with integrated phone with speakerphone, Bluetooth	Verizon Wireless, Sprint, Telus, Alltel, and Bell Mobility
7130	7130c	2006-06-11		large 240×260 colour	850/900/1800/1900 MHz GSM/GPRS/EDGE	with integrated phone with speakerphone, Bluetooth	AT&T
7130	7130g	2006-06-01		large 240×260 colour	850/900/1800/1900 MHz GSM/GPRS/EDGE	with integrated phone with speakerphone, Bluetooth	O2 (UK), O2 (Ireland), Airtel
7130	7130v	2006-06-18		large 240×260 colour	850/900/1800/1900 MHz GSM/GPRS/EDGE	with integrated phone with speakerphone, Bluetooth	Vodafone

== Consumer models (8000 and 9000 series) ==
Beginning with the 8700-series models in 2006, RIM began to aggressively add consumer features to BlackBerry models, in an aim to capture more of the consumer market from competitors such as Treo, Nokia Eseries, and Motorola Q. In this progression of models, the additions include better quality screens, more memory, built-in chat software, cameras, microSD memory card support, built-in mapping software, and other consumer-specific features. The BlackBerry Pearl 8100 was the first BlackBerry without a trackwheel, which was replaced by a miniature trackball to enable full 4-way and mouse-style navigation on a BlackBerry. The look of the new trackball gave the "Pearl" its name.

The 9000 series was launched in 2008.

Family	Model	Release date	Photo	Screen	Network	Notes	Carriers
"Electron"	8700c	2005-10-31		large 320×240 pixels (QVGA) and 65K colors depth	850/900/1800/1900 MHz GSM/GPRS/EDGE	integrated phone with speakerphone, Bluetooth	AT&T
"Electron"	8700r	2005-11-08		large 320×240 pixels (QVGA) and 65K colors depth	850/900/1800/1900 MHz GSM/GPRS/EDGE	integrated phone with speakerphone, Bluetooth	Rogers Wireless
"Electron"	8700f	2005-11-27		large 320×240 pixels (QVGA) and 65K colors depth	850/900/1800/1900 MHz GSM/GPRS/EDGE	integrated phone with speakerphone, Bluetooth	Orange
"Electron"	8700g	2006-01-16		large 320×240 pixels (QVGA) and 65K colors depth	850/900/1800/1900 MHz GSM/GPRS/EDGE	integrated phone with speakerphone, Bluetooth	Many GSM providers including Sprint, T-Mobile, O2 (UK), O2 (Ireland), and Telefonica Moviles
"Electron"	8700v	2006-02-28		large 320×240 pixels (QVGA) and 65K colors depth	850/900/1800/1900 MHz GSM/GPRS/EDGE	integrated phone with speakerphone, Bluetooth	Vodafone
"Electron"	8703e	2006-09-16		large 320×240 pixels (QVGA) and 65K colors depth	800/1900 MHz CDMA, CDMA2000 1X and EVDO	integrated phone with speakerphone, Bluetooth	Verizon Wireless, Sprint, Alltel, Bell Mobility, Telus, US Cellular
"Electron"	8707g	2006-08-14		large 320×240 pixels (QVGA) and 65K colors depth	850/900/1800/1900 MHz GSM/GPRS 2100 MHz UMTS	integrated phone with speakerphone, Bluetooth	O2 (UK), O2 (Ireland), Viettel
"Electron"	8707h	2006-09-25		large 320×240 pixels (QVGA) and 65K colors depth	850/900/1800/1900 MHz GSM/GPRS 2100 MHz W-CDMA	integrated phone with speakerphone, Bluetooth	NTT DoCoMo (Japan)
"Electron"	8707v	2006-06-15		large 320×240 pixels (QVGA) and 65K colors depth	850/900/1800/1900 MHz GSM/GPRS 2100 MHz UMTS	integrated phone with speakerphone, Bluetooth	Vodafone UK, Vodafone Smartone (Hong Kong), Vodafone (Italy)
"Pearl"	8100	2006-09-06		240×260 with 65K colors	850/900/1800/1900 MHz GSM/GPRS/EDGE	new trackball interface, 1.3 MP camera, speakerphone, Bluetooth, microSDHC (to 8 GB with handheld code 4.5), polyphonic ringtones, media player	Rogers Wireless, Cincinnati Bell, AT&T, Vodafone, Orange (UK), T-Mobile (UK/US), O2 (UK), O2 (Ireland) and Vodafone (Ireland), Telcel (Mexico), Vodafone and TIM (Italy), Vodafone and Essar (India), Airtel (India), Mobily (Saudi Arabia), Mobilink (Pakistan), MTN (Nigeria) and Ufone (Pakistan), Viettel
"Pearl"	8110	2008-01-21		240×260 with 65K colors	850/900/1800/1900 MHz GSM/GPRS/EDGE	trackball interface, 2 MP camera, speakerphone, Bluetooth, external microSDHC (to 8 GB with handheld code 4.5), polyphonic ringtones, media player, GPS	AT&T, Vodafone, O2 (UK), O2 (Ireland), iWireless, and T-Mobile.
"Pearl"	8120	2008-04-20	BlackBerry 8120	240×260 with 65K colors	850/900/1800/1900 MHz GSM/GPRS/EDGE	trackball interface, 2 MP camera, speakerphone, Bluetooth, external microSDHC (to 8 GB with handheld code 4.5), polyphonic ringtones, media player, Wi-Fi, UMA	O2 (UK), AT&T, and T-Mobile.
"Pearl"	8130	2007-09-30	BlackBerry 8130	240×260 with 65K colors	800/1900 CDMA/EVDO	Trackball Interface, 2 MP camera, speakerphone, Bluetooth, microSDHC (to 8 GB with handheld code 4.5), polyphonic/MP3 ringtones, media player, GPS	Bell Mobility, Telus Mobility, Sprint, Verizon Wireless, Alltel, US Cellular
"Pearl"	9100	2010-07-27		360×400 pixels @ 240 PPI	850/900/1800/1900 GSM/GPRS/EDGE, (800/850)/1900/2100 or 900/1700/2100 MHz UMTS	optical trackpad interface, 3.2 MP camera, speakerphone, Bluetooth, external microSD (to 32 GB, 2 GB included), 256MB internal Flash Memory SDRAM, mp3 ringtones, media player, GPS, Wi-Fi 802.11 b/g/n	AT&T, Entel PCS, Wind Mobile
"Pearl Flip"	8220	2008-10-05		Internal Display: 240×320 pixels (QVGA) 65K colors. External Display: 128×160 pixel 65K colors	850/900/1800/1900 MHz GSM/GPRS/EDGE	trackball interface, 2 MP camera, speakerphone, Bluetooth, external microSDHC (up to 16 GB), polyphonic ringtones, media player, "Clamshell" form factor, 128 MB flash memory Wi-Fi, UMA	O2 (UK), T-Mobile (USA), TIM (Italy), iWireless, and Rogers Wireless (Canada).
"Pearl Flip"	8230	2009-06-18		Internal Display: 240×320 pixels (QVGA) 65K colors. External Display: 128×160 pixel 65K colors	800/1900 MHz CDMA2000 1xRTT/EVDO	trackball interface, 2 MP camera, speakerphone, Bluetooth, external microSDHC (up to 16 GB), polyphonic ringtones, media player, "Clamshell" form factor, 128 MB flash memory	Verizon (USA), Alltel (USA), US Cellular (USA), Bell Mobility, Telus Mobility (Canada).
"88XX"	8800	2007-02-19		320×240 pixels (QVGA) with 65K colors	850/900/1800/1900 MHz GSM/GPRS/EDGE	trackball interface, GPS receiver, speakerphone, Bluetooth, external microSDHC (to 8 GB with handheld code 4.5), polyphonic ringtones, media player	AT&T, T-Mobile, Rogers Wireless, T-Mobile (EU), Vodafone (EU), TIM (Italy), O2 (UK), Orange (EU), Proximus (Belgium), Bouygues Telecom (France), SFR (France), Telefónica Móviles (Spain), LUXGSM (Luxembourg), Telenor (Pakistan), Turkcell (Turkey), Sure Mobile (Isle of Man), BeeLine (Russia)
"88XX"	8820	2007-09-14	BlackBerry 8820	320×240 pixels (QVGA) with 65K colors	850/900/1800/1900 MHz GSM/GPRS/EDGE, WiFi a+b/g +WMM Multiple IEEE 802.11 Wi-Fi standard support (a/b/g)	trackball interface, GPS receiver, speakerphone, Bluetooth, external microSDHC (to 8 GB with handheld code 4.5), polyphonic ringtones, media player	Orange (EU), AT&T, T-Mobile (USA), Mobistar (Belgium), SFR (France), British Telecom (UK), Telcel (Mexico), Vodafone (Netherlands), Ufone (Pakistan), O2 (UK), iWireless.
"88XX"	8830	2007-5-13	BlackBerry 8830	320×240 pixels (QVGA) with 65K colors	800/1900 MHz CDMA, CDMA2000 1X and EVDO, 900/1800 MHz GSM/GPRS	trackball interface, GPS receiver, speakerphone, Bluetooth, external microSDHC (to 8 GB with handheld code 4.5), polyphonic ringtones, media player	Bell Mobility, Telus, Verizon Wireless, Sprint, Alltel, US Cellular, Iusacell (Mexico)
"Curve"	8300	2007-05-09		320×240 pixels (QVGA) with 65K colors	850/900/1800/1900 MHz GSM/GPRS/EDGE	trackball interface, 2 MP camera, speakerphone, Bluetooth, internal microSDHC (to 8 GB with handheld code 4.5), polyphonic ringtones, media player	Airtel (India), Vodafone (India), Etisalat (UAE), AT&T, Mobilink (Pakistan), Rogers Wireless, O2 (UK), O2 (Ireland).
"Curve"	8310	2007-10-16		320×240 pixels (QVGA) with 65K colors	850/900/1800/1900 MHz GSM/GPRS/EDGE	trackball interface, 2 MP camera, GPS receiver, speakerphone, Bluetooth, internal microSD, polyphonic ringtones, media player	Vodafone (Germany, The Netherlands), AT&T, SFR (France), Rogers Wireless, Bouygues Telecom France, Vodafone UK, O2 (UK), O2 (Ireland), T-Mobile (Slovakia), iWireless, China Mobile.
"Curve"	8320	2007-09-24		320×240 pixels (QVGA) with 65K colors	850/900/1800/1900 MHz GSM/GPRS/EDGE/Wi-Fi	Trackball interface, 2 Megapixel camera, speakerphone, Bluetooth, internal microSDHC (to 16 GB with handheld code 4.5.0.81), polyphonic ringtones, media player, Wi-Fi, Hotspot@Home compatible.	AT&T, T-Mobile (USA), Orange (Slovakia), Viettel
"Curve"	8330	2008-04-30	BlackBerry 8330	320×240 pixels (QVGA) with 65K colors	Dual-band 800/1900 MHz CDMA2000 1X EV-DO networks	Trackball interface, 2 Megapixel camera, speakerphone, Bluetooth, internal microSDHC (to 8 GB with handheld code 4.5), polyphonic ringtones, media player, GPS.	Telus Mobility, Bell Mobility, Alltel, Sprint, Verizon Wireless, US Cellular, Credo Mobile, Boost Mobile.
"Curve"	8350i			320×240 pixels (QVGA) with 65K colors	iDEN, Wi-Fi	Trackball interface, 2 Megapixel camera, speakerphone, Bluetooth, internal microSDHC (to 8 GB with handheld code 4.5), polyphonic ringtones, media player, GPS, WiFi, next generation OS (4.6)	Sprint Nextel
"Curve"	8900/8910(Javelin) 8980 (Atlas)	2009-2-10	BlackBerry 8520	480×360 pixels @ 65K colours, 250 PPI	850/900/1800/1900 MHz GSM/GPRS/EDGE	Trackball interface, 3.2 MP camera with flash and autofocus, speakerphone, Bluetooth 2.0, WiFi 802.11 a/b/g (8910 no wifi), UMA, GPS, external microSDHC (to 16 GB), 3.5 mm stereo audio jack	T-Mobile (USA & Germany), AT&T, Rogers (Canada), Orange (UK), O2 (UK), iWireless, AIS, China Mobile (8910 & 8980 model).
"Curve"	8520 (Gemini)	2009-08-04	BlackBerry 8900	320×240 pixels @ 65K	GSM/GPRS/EDGE 850/900/1800/1900	Optical Trackpad, 2.0 MP camera with video recording, speakerphone, Bluetooth 2.x, WiFi 802.11 b/g, UMA, 3.5 mm stereo audio jack	T-Mobile (USA), Virgin Mobile, Rogers, Fido, iWireless, Cincinnati Bell, Vodafone (Europe), DTAC, AIS, True Move,
"Curve"	8530 (Aries)	2009-11-19		320×240 pixels @ 65K	CDMA/1xRTT/EV-DO 800/1900	Optical Trackpad, 2.0 MP camera with video recording, speakerphone, Bluetooth 2.x, WiFi 802.11 b/g, UMA, 3.5 mm stereo audio jack, GPS	Verizon, Sprint, Virgin Mobile USA, MetroPCS, Bell Mobility, Telus Mobility
"Curve"	9300/9330	2010-09-14		320×240 pixels @ 65K	9300 UMTS (800/850)/1900/2100 OR GSM/GPRS/EDGE 850/900/1800/1900; 9330 CDMA/1xRTT/EV-DO 800/1900	Optical Trackpad, 2.0 MP camera with video recording, speakerphone, Bluetooth 2.1, WiFi 802.11 b/g/n, UMA, 3.5 mm stereo audio jack, GPS	AT&T, Rogers, T-Mobile USA, Telus, Bell, Virgin Mobile, Verizon Wireless, Wind Mobile
"Bold"	9000	2008-08-04	BlackBerry 9000	480×320 pixels (HVGA with 65K colors @220 PPI	850/900/1800/1900 MHz GSM/GPRS/EDGE, UMTS/HSDPA (DoCoMo model features additional 800 MHz WCDMA frequency), WiFi	Trackball interface, 2 MP fixed-focus camera, speakerphone, Bluetooth, Wi-Fi 802.11 a/b/g, GPS, external microSDHC (to 16 GB), 3.5 mm stereo audio jack	AT&T, Rogers, Turkcell, Telenor (Pakistan), Airtel DoCoMo, O2 (UK), DTAC, AIS, True Move, Viettel
"Bold"	9650	2010-06-03	BlackBerry 9650	480×360 pixels (HVGA with 65K colors @ 250 PPI	GSM/GPRS/EDGE 850/900/1800/1900, UMTS/HSDPA 2100 and CDMA/EV-DO 800/1900	Trackpad interface, 3.2 MP camera, speakerphone, Bluetooth, Wi-Fi 802.11 b/g, GPS, external microSDHC (to 32 GB), 3.5 mm stereo audio jack	Verizon, Sprint
"Bold"	9700	2009-11-01		480×360 pixels (HVGA with 65K colors @ 250 PPI	UMTS/HSDPA 2100 / 1900 / 850 / 800 MHz and GSM/GPRS/EDGE 1900 / 1800 / 900 / 850 MHz OR' UMTS 2100 / 1700 / 900 MHz and GSM/GPRS/EDGE 1900 / 1800 / 900 / 850 MHz WiFi	Trackpad interface, 3.2 MP camera, speakerphone, Bluetooth, Wi-Fi 802.11 b/g, GPS, external microSDHC (to 32 GB), 3.5 mm stereo audio jack	AT&T, Bell, Rogers, T-Mobile USA, Telus, True Move, Ufone, Wind Mobile
"Bold"	9780	2010-11-16		480×360 pixels (HVGA with 65K colors @ 250 PPI	UMTS/HSDPA 2100 / 1900 / 850 / 800 MHz and GSM/GPRS/EDGE 1900 / 1800 / 900 / 850 MHz OR' UMTS 2100 / 1700 / 900 MHz and GSM/GPRS/EDGE 1900 / 1800 / 900 / 850 MHz WiFi	Trackpad interface, 5 MP autofocus camera, speakerphone, Bluetooth, Wi-Fi 802.11 b/g, GPS, external microSDHC (to 32 GB), 3.5 mm stereo audio jack	Bell, Mobilicity, Rogers, T-Mobile USA, Telus, Wind Mobile
"BlackBerry 9720"	9720	2013-08-12	BlackBerry 9720	480×360 pixels @ 214 ppi	EDGE, HSPA, UMTS/HSDPA, HSUPA	Touch screen, optical trackpad, QWERTY keypad, microSD, 5 megapixel flash, Bluetooth 2.1	Carphone Warehouse, Orange, T-Mobile UK, Unlocked Mobiles UK, Vodafone UK, TIM (Italy)
"Storm"	9500	2008-11-13		360×480 pixels @ 262K	GSM/GPRS/EDGE 850/900/1800/1900, UMTS HSPA 2100	Clickable Touchscreen interface, 3.2 MP camera, Bluetooth, 1 GB Internal Flash, 3.5 mm stereo audio jack, external microSDHC (to 32 GB)	Vodafone
"Storm"	9530	2008-11-20		360×480 pixels @ 262K	CDMA EV-DO 800/1900, GSM/GPRS/EDGE 850/900/1800/1900, UMTS HSPA 2100	Clickable Touchscreen interface, 3.2 MP camera, Bluetooth, 1 GB Internal Flash, 3.5 mm stereo audio jack, external microSDHC (to 32 GB)	Verizon, Telus (Canada), Bell (Canada)
"Storm2"	9520	2009-10-27		360×480 pixels @ 262K	GSM/GPRS/EDGE 850/900/1800/1900, UMTS HSPA 2100, Wi-Fi	Clickable Touchscreen interface, 3.2 MP camera, Bluetooth, 2 GB Internal Flash, 3.5 mm stereo audio jack, external microSDHC (to 32 GB)	Vodafone
"Storm2"	9550	2009-10-27		360×480 pixels @ 262K	CDMA EV-DO 800/1900, GSM/GPRS/EDGE 850/900/1800/1900, UMTS HSPA 2100, Wi-Fi	Clickable Touchscreen interface, 3.2 MP camera, Bluetooth, 2 GB Internal Flash, 3.5 mm stereo audio jack, external microSDHC (to 32 GB)	Verizon, Telus (Canada), Bell (Canada)
"Tour"	9630	2009-07-11	BlackBerry 9630	480×360 pixels @ 262K colours, 250 PPI	CDMA EV-DO 800/1900, GSM/GPRS/EDGE 850/900/1800/1900, UMTS HSPA 2100, Wi-Fi	Trackball interface, 3.2 MP camera, speakerphone, Bluetooth, GPS, external microSDHC (to 32 GB), 3.5 mm stereo audio jack	Verizon, Sprint, Credo Mobile, Telus (Canada), Bell (Canada)
"Style"	9670	2010-10-30		360×400 pixels (internal), 240×320 (external)		Full Qwerty flip design, Optical Trackpad, 5 MP camera, speakerphone, Bluetooth, GPS, microSDHC (to 32 GB), 3.5 mm stereo audio jack, wifi	Sprint, Bell Mobility, TELUS Mobility (Canada)
"Torch"	9800	2010-08-11	BlackBerry Torch	360×480 pixels	UMTS 2100/1900/850/800 and GSM/GPRS/EDGE 850/900/1800/1900 3g/wi-f1	Optical Trackpad, Capacitive Touchscreen interface, 5 MP camera, speakerphone, Bluetooth 2.1, Wi-Fi 802.11 b/g/n, GPS, external microSDHC, 3.5 mm stereo audio jack	AT&T, Bell Mobility (Canada), TELUS Mobility (Canada), Rogers Wireless (Canada)
"Torch"	9810	2011-08-11		480×640 pixels @ 250 PPI	UMTS 2100/1900/850/800 and GSM/GPRS/EDGE 850/900/1800/1900 HSPA+	Optical Trackpad, Capacitive Touchscreen interface, 5 MP camera, speakerphone, Bluetooth 2.1, Wi-Fi 802.11 b/g/n, GPS, external microSDHC, 3.5 mm stereo audio jack	AT&T, Bell Mobility (Canada), TELUS Mobility (Canada), Rogers Wireless (Canada)
"Torch"	9850	2011-08-20		480×800 pixels @ 250 PPI	CDMA EV-DO 800/1900, GSM/GPRS/EDGE 850/900/1800/1900, UMTS HSPA 2100	Optical Trackpad, Capacitive Touchscreen interface, 5 MP camera, speakerphone, Bluetooth 2.1, Wi-Fi 802.11 b/g/n, GPS, external microSDHC, 3.5 mm stereo audio jack	Verizon, Sprint, U.S. Cellular
"Torch"	9860	2011-08-20		480×800 pixels @ 250 PPI	UMTS 2100/1900/850/800 and GSM/GPRS/EDGE 850/900/1800/1900	Optical Trackpad, Capacitive Touchscreen interface, 5 MP camera, speakerphone, Bluetooth 2.1, Wi-Fi 802.11 b/g/n, GPS, external microSDHC, 3.5 mm stereo audio jack	AT&T, Bell Mobility (Canada), TELUS Mobility (Canada), Rogers Wireless (Canada)
"Bold Touch"	9790	2011-11-30		480×360 pixels	UMTS 2100/1900/850/800 MHz or 2100/1700/900 MHz and GSM/GPRS/EDGE 850/900/1800/1900	Optical Trackpad, Capacitive Touchscreen interface, 5 MP camera, speakerphone, Bluetooth 2.1, Wi-Fi 802.11 a/b/g/n, GPS, external microSDHC, 3.5 mm stereo audio jack, 1.0 GHz processor, NFC Mobile Payment System	T-Mobile, Rogers, Bell, Telus
"Bold Touch"	9900	2011-08-08	BlackBerry Bold 9900	640×480 pixels	UMTS 2100/1900/850/800 MHz or 2100/1700/900 MHz and GSM/GPRS/EDGE 850/900/1800/1900	Optical Trackpad, Capacitive Touchscreen interface, 5 MP camera, speakerphone, Bluetooth 2.1, Wi-Fi 802.11 a/b/g/n, GPS, external microSDHC, 3.5 mm stereo audio jack, 1.2 GHz processor, Thinnest BlackBerry, NFC Mobile Payment System	T-Mobile, AT&T, Rogers, Bell, Telus
"Bold Touch"	9930	2011-08-15		640×480 pixels	CDMA EV-DO 800/1900, GSM/GPRS/EDGE 850/900/1800/1900, UMTS HSPA 2100/900	Optical Trackpad, Capacitive Touchscreen interface, 5 MP camera, speakerphone, Bluetooth 2.1, Wi-Fi 802.11 a/b/g/n, GPS, external microSDHC, 3.5 mm stereo audio jack, 1.2 GHz processor, Thinnest BlackBerry, NFC Mobile Payment System	Verizon, Sprint
"BlackBerry Porsche Design"	P'9981	2012-02-11		2.8" 640×480 pixel colour (VGA)	850/900/1800/1900 MHz GSM/GPRS/EDGE; 850/1900/2100 MHz UMTS	Luxury variant of the BlackBerry Bold 9900 with stainless-steel frame, leather back and custom Porsche Design interface; 1.2 GHz Snapdragon MSM8655 CPU, 768 MB RAM, 8 GB storage plus microSD (up to 32 GB); limited-edition premium handset originally sold through select retailers such as Harrods.	

=== Porsche Design series ===
In 2011 BlackBerry announced a partnership with Porsche Design to produce a small number of luxury handsets that used the internals of its current flagships but replaced the exterior with premium materials and a bespoke user interface.

The first model was the BlackBerry Porsche Design P'9981, based on the BlackBerry Bold 9900 and introduced in late 2011, with general availability from early 2012. It retained the Bold 9900's 1.2 GHz Qualcomm Snapdragon MSM8655 processor, 768 MB of RAM, 8 GB of internal storage and 5 megapixel 720p camera, but added a stainless-steel frame, angular metal QWERTY keyboard and leather back cover, and shipped with a custom Porsche Design theme and unique PIN range.

The second model, the BlackBerry Porsche Design P'9982, was released in December 2013 as a luxury variant of the BlackBerry Z10. It used the same 4.2 inch 1280×768 display, 1.5 GHz dual-core Qualcomm Snapdragon S4 Plus processor and 2 GB of RAM as the Z10, but increased internal storage to 64 GB, added a stainless steel and satin-finished body and introduced a Porsche Design interface with custom icons, lock screen and BBM PINs.

The final model in the series, the BlackBerry Porsche Design P'9983, was announced in September 2014 as a QWERTY-equipped BlackBerry 10 device with a 3.1 inch 720×720 display, 1.5 GHz dual-core Snapdragon S4 chip, 2 GB of RAM and 64 GB of internal storage plus microSD expansion. It closely followed the hardware of the BlackBerry Q10, but added a glass-like rear panel, redesigned keyboard with forged-look key caps and a Porsche Design software theme; later "Graphite" variants were sold in limited numbers at prices exceeding US$1,500 in some markets.

== BlackBerry 10 ==
Family	Model	Release date	Photo	Screen	Processor	Battery Life	Network	Carriers
BlackBerry 10	Z10	2013-01-30	BlackBerry Z10	4.2" 1280×768 pixels	Dual-Core 1.5 GHz	10 hours (talk), 13 days (standby time)	4G LTE	AT&T, Verizon, T-Mobile, Bell Mobility (Canada), TELUS Mobility (Canada), Rogers Wireless (Canada), Wind Mobile
BlackBerry 10	Q10	2013-04-30	BlackBerry Q10	3.1" 720×720 pixels	Dual-Core 1.5 GHz	13.5 hours (talk), 14.8 days (standby time)	4G LTE	AT&T, Verizon, T-Mobile, Bell Mobility (Canada), TELUS Mobility (Canada), Rogers Wireless (Canada), Sprint
BlackBerry 10	Q5	2013-06-19	BlackBerry Q5	3.1" 720×720 pixels	Dual-Core 1.2 GHz	12.5 hours (talk), 14 days (standby time)	4G LTE	Axiom, Bell, Fido, Koodo, SaskTel, TELUS, Virgin Mobile (Canada), Sprint
BlackBerry 10	Z30	2013-09-26	BlackBerry Z30	5" 1280×720 pixels	Dual-Core 1.7 GHz	18 hours (talk), 16 days (standby time)	4G LTE	Bell Mobility, MTS Mobility, Rogers Wireless, SaskTel, Telus Mobility, and Verizon Wireless
BlackBerry 10	P'9982	2013-11-18		4.2" 1280×768 pixels	Dual-Core 1.5 GHz	10 hours (talk), 13 days (standby time)	4G LTE	
BlackBerry 10	Z3	2014-05-12		5" 960×540 pixels	Dual-Core 1.2 GHz			
BlackBerry 10	Passport	2014-10-23	BlackBerry Passport	4.5" 1440×1440 pixels	Quad-Core 2.2 GHz	24 hours (talk), 14.5 days (standby time)	4G LTE	AT&T
BlackBerry 10	Classic	2014-12-16	BlackBerry Classic	3.5" 720×720 pixels	Dual-Core 1.5 GHz	17.2 hours (talk), 15.2 days (standby time)	4G LTE	AT&T, Verizon, T-Mobile
BlackBerry 10	P'9983	2014-09-22		3.1" 720×720 pixels	Dual-Core 1.5 GHz	14 hours (talk) 12 days (standby time)	4G LTE	
BlackBerry 10	Leap	2015-04-14		5" 720×1280p	Dual-Core 1.5 GHz	25 hours talk time	4G LTE	

== Android ==
Family	Model	Release date	Photo	Screen	Processor	Battery Life	Network	Carriers	Manufacturer
Android	Priv	2015-11-05		5.43" 2560×1440 pixels	Qualcomm Snapdragon 808	3410 mAh	4G LTE	US: AT&T, T-Mobile, Verizon; Canada: Bell, Rogers, SaskTel, Telus, Wind; Hong Kong: 3 Hong Kong, China Mobile Hong Kong, CSL	BlackBerry Limited
Android	DTEK50	2016-07-25		5.2" 1920×1080 pixels	Quad-core 1.5 GHz & Quad-core 1.2 GHz	2610 mAh	4G LTE		TCL Corporation
Android	DTEK60	2016-10-27		5.5" 2560x1440 pixels	Quad-core 2x 2.15 GHz Kryo & Quad-core 2x 1.6 GHz Kyro	3000 mAh	4G LTE		TCL Corporation
Android	KeyOne	2017-02-25		4.5" LCD 1620 x 1080	Qualcomm Snapdragon 625	3505mAh	4G LTE	US: Sprint, AT&T. Unlocked: T-Mobile, Verizon; Canada: Bell, Rogers, SaskTel, Telus	BlackBerry Mobile (TCL Corporation), BB Merah Putih, Optiemus Infracom
Android	KeyOne Limited Edition Black			4.5" LCD 1620 x 1080	Qualcomm Snapdragon 625	3505mAh	4G LTE	N/A	Optiemus Infracom, BB Merah Putih
Android	Aurora	2017-03-08		5.5" 720 x 1280	Qualcomm Snapdragon 425	3000mAh	4G LTE		BB Merah Putih
Android	Motion	2017-11-09		5.5" LCD 1920 x 1080	Qualcomm Snapdragon 625	4000mAh	4G LTE	N/A	BlackBerry Mobile (TCL Corporation)
Android	Key2	2018-07-13		4.5" LCD 1620 x 1080	Qualcomm Snapdragon 660	3500mAh	4G LTE		BlackBerry Mobile (TCL Corporation), Optiemus Infracom
Android	Key2 LE	2018-12-06		4.5" LCD 1620 x 1080	Qualcomm Snapdragon 636	3000mAh	4G LTE		BlackBerry Mobile (TCL Corporation), Optiemus Infracom
Android	Evolve	2018-10-10		5.99" LCD 2160 x 1080	Qualcomm Snapdragon 450	4000mAh	4G LTE		Optiemus Infracom
Android	Evolve X	2018-08-01		5.99" LCD 2160 x 1080	Qualcomm Snapdragon 660	4000mAh	4G LTE		Optiemus Infracom

== Tablets ==
Family	Model	Release date	Photo	Screen	Processor	Battery life	Network	Carriers	Manufacturer
BlackBerry Tablet OS	PlayBook	2011-04-18		7" LCD 1024 x 600	1 GHz Texas Instruments OMAP 4430	5300 mAh	WiFi	N/A	Quanta Computer
BlackBerry Tablet OS	PlayBook 4G LTE	2012-08-08		7" LCD 1024 x 600	Dual-core 1.5 GHz processor	6000 mAh	4G LTE, WiFi, HSDPA 900 / 1700 / 1900 / 2100 / 800	US: Sprint, AT&T. Unlocked: T-Mobile, Verizon; Canada: Bell, Rogers, SaskTel, Telus	Quanta Computer
