= C300 =

C300 may refer to:

- C300 Ground Refuel Vehicle, a USAF ground vehicle
- Canon C300, a professional Canon video camera
- Canal 300, a public television channel operated by Televisió de Catalunya in Catalonia
- Kodak EasyShare C300, a camera model
- Mercedes Benz C300 (C350), a car
- Pantech PG-C300, a camera phone advertised as "the world's smallest camera phone" (as of September 2006)
