= Pantech C300 =

Camera flip phone

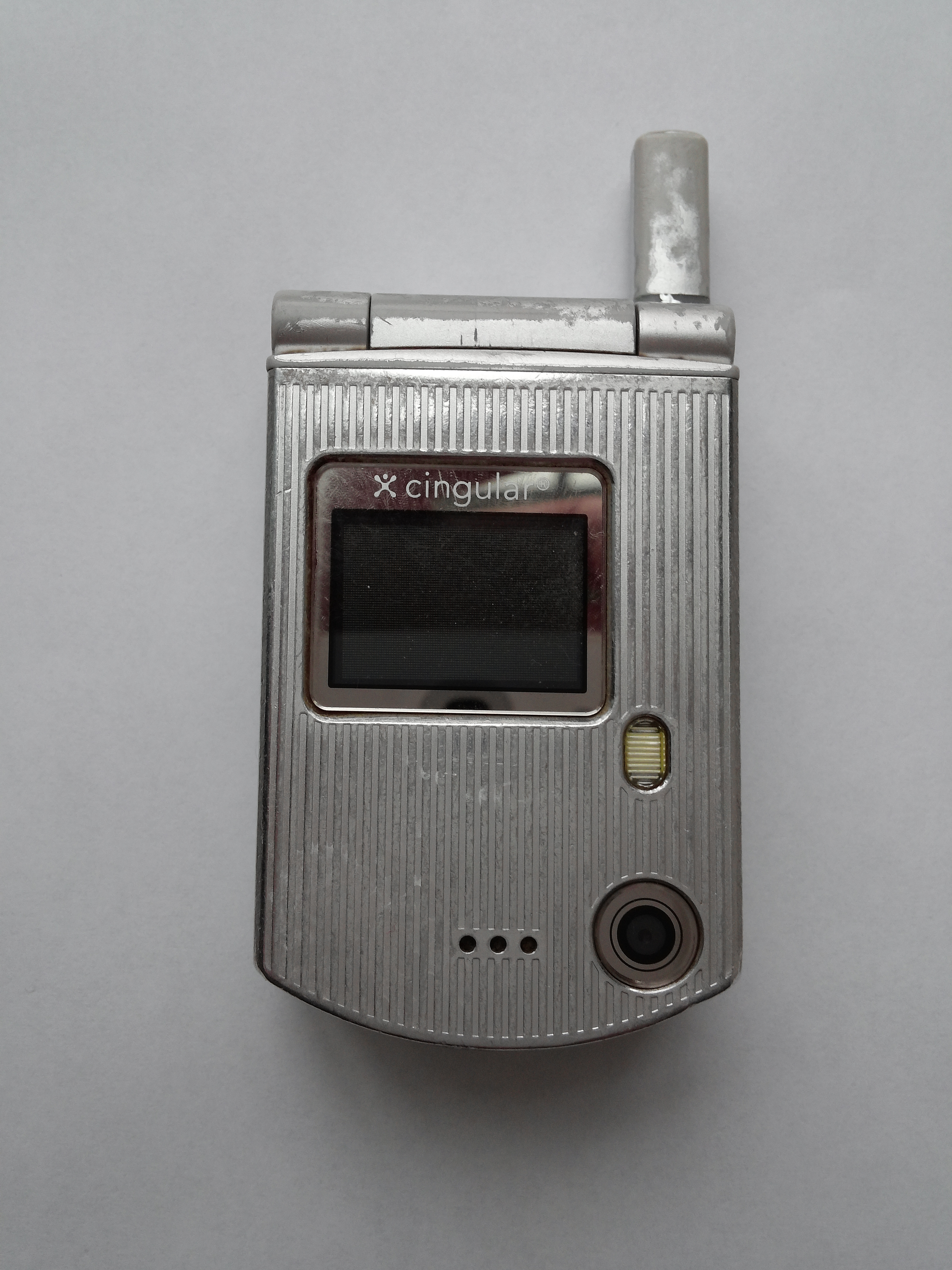
- A closed Pantech C300
- Manufacturer: Pantech Curitel
- Type: Camera phone
- Compatible networks: GSM 850, 1800, 1900 MHz; GPRS
- Form factor: Flip
- Dimensions: 2.72 in (69 mm) H 1.69 in (43 mm) W 0.76 in (19 mm) D
- Weight: 2.5 oz (71 g)
- Storage: 13.4 MB
- Rear camera: 0.3 MP; Flash
- Display: LCD; 18-bit color
- External display: LCD
- Data inputs: Keypad
- SAR: 1.42 W/kg

The Pantech C300 is the world's smallest camera flip phone available commercially. It is manufactured by the South Korean cellphone company Pantech Curitel. The Pantech C300's dimensions are 2.72 by 1.69 by .76 inches. The C300 is licensed by AT&T Mobility and iWireless in the U.S. and Rogers Wireless in Canada.

The Pantech C300's features include:

- Flash camera
- Picture and video messaging
- World phone
- MP3 ringtones
- Instant messaging
- Speakerphone and call forwarding
- Calendar with reminders

Some criticisms of the phone are that it is quite bulky depth-wise for its small length and width.
