= BlackBerry Curve 8520 =

Discontinued smartphone by BlackBerry Limited

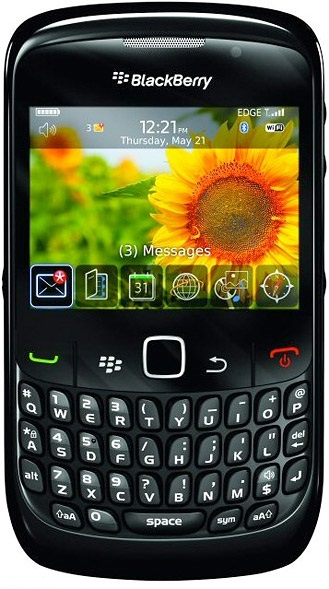
- Also known as: BlackBerry Gemini
- Manufacturer: BlackBerry
- Type: Candybar smartphone
- Availability by region: September 2009
- Predecessor: BlackBerry Pearl 8100 series
- Successor: BlackBerry Curve 9220
- Related: BlackBerry Pearl 3G 9100/9105; BlackBerry Bold 9700; BlackBerry Curve 9300
- Compatible networks: GSM 800/900/1800/1900 MHz
- Form factor: Bar
- Dimensions: 109×60×13.9 mm (4.29×2.36×0.55 in)
- Weight: 106 g (4 oz) (with battery)
- Operating system: BlackBerry OS 5.0
- CPU: 512 MHz
- Memory: 256 MB flash, 256 MB RAM
- Removable storage: microSDHC Hot-swappable, support for up to 32 GB
- Battery: Li-Ion 1150 mAh battery lithium-polymer
- Rear camera: 2 megapixels (1600 x 1200 pixels)
- Front camera: No
- Display: 320×240 px (0.1 megapixels), 2.46 in, up to 65 k colours
- Connectivity: WLAN Wi-Fi 802.11 b, g, Integrated; Bluetooth 2.0, microUSB, 3.5 mm audio jack
- Data inputs: QWERTY thumb keyboard, Optical trackpad

The BlackBerry Curve 8520 (also known as BlackBerry Gemini) is a smartphone from the BlackBerry Curve series manufactured in Canada that was launched on August 27, 2009 and was in production until April 2012. It was BlackBerry's first entry-level device, targeted for emerging market consumers.

== Description ==
The BlackBerry Curve 8520 was a consumer-oriented smartphone and had standard features including mobile email, a calendar and instant messaging among many others.

The Curve 8520 had a new touch-sensitive optical trackpad as opposed to the trackball used on many other BlackBerry devices - this is said to improve the ease of scrolling through menus, emails, web pages and images.

This phone was capable of browsing the web with the EDGE/2G network and receive and send emails via BlackBerry's push email network.

The Curve 8520 was discontinued in April 2012, when the BlackBerry Curve 9220 was introduced as its successor.
