= BlackBerry Pearl =

Smartphones developed by Research In Motion

BlackBerry Pearl (8100 / 8110 / 8120 / 8130)
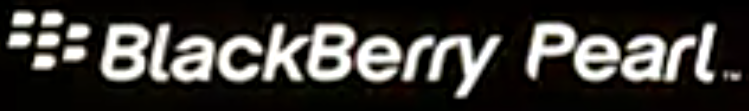

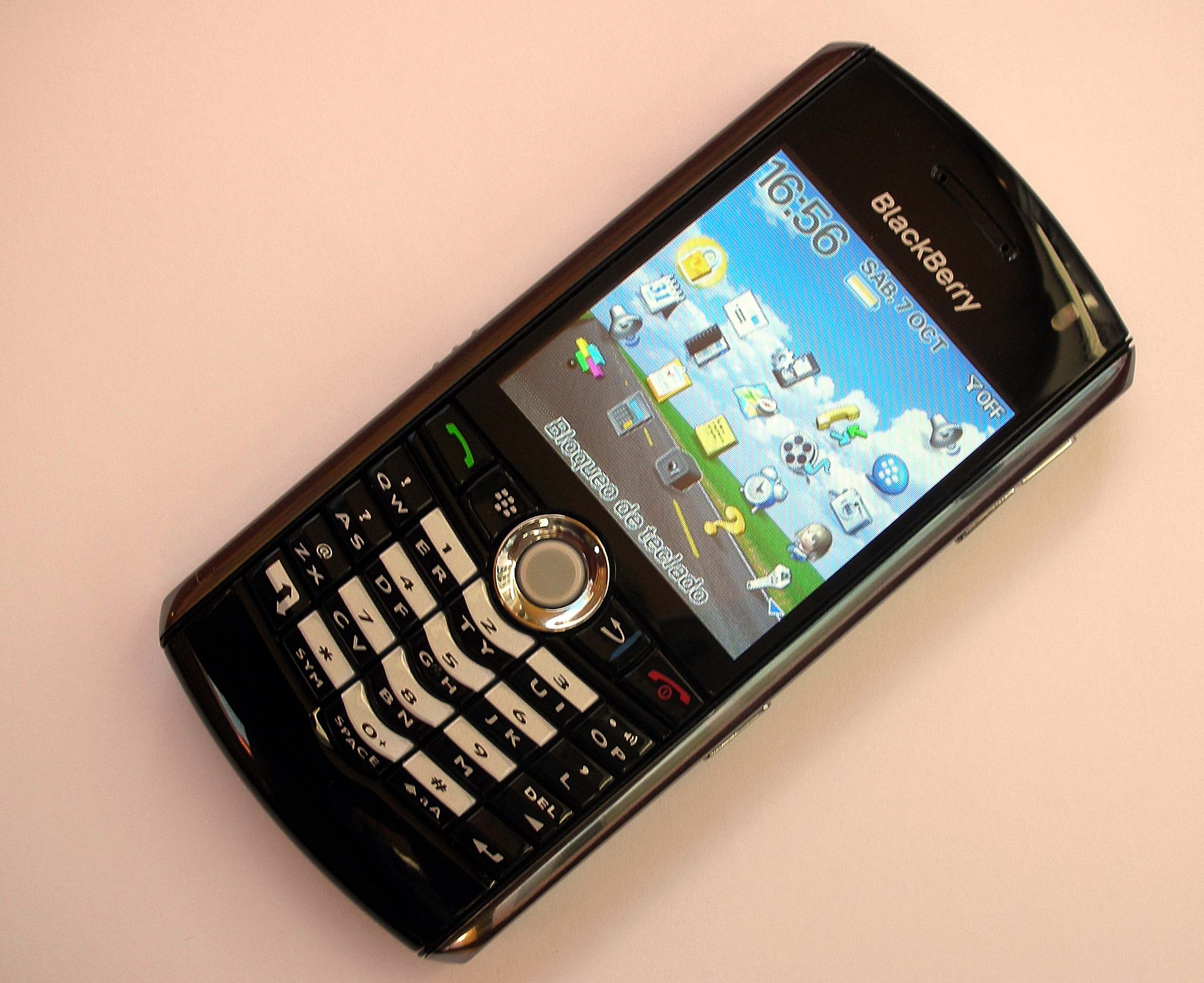
- First released: September 12, 2006; 20 years ago
- Discontinued: c. 2010
- Successor: BlackBerry Curve
- Related: Blackberry Charm; BlackBerry 7130
- Compatible networks: GSM/EDGE 850 / 900 / 1800 / 1900 (8100, 8110, 8120); CDMA 850 / 1900 (8130 only)
- Form factor: Bar
- Dimensions: 107×51×15 mm (4.21×2.01×0.59 in)
- Weight: 90.7 g (3.20 oz)
- Operating system: BlackBerry OS 4.5 (shipped)
- Memory: 64 MB, MicroSD slot
- Rear camera: 1.33 megapixel (8100) or 2.0 megapixel (8110/8120/8130)
- Display: 240x260 pixel, 57 mm (2.25 in) diagonal, 62 pixels/cm (157 ppi), 65536 colors (16-bit) TFT LCD
- Connectivity: Wi-Fi (8120 and 8220 only), Bluetooth, USB (with Mass Storage Mode support)

The BlackBerry Pearl is a smartphone developed by Research In Motion (RIM). The Pearl (8100) was launched on September 12, 2006, marking the first BlackBerry device with a camera, media player and other multimedia features, significantly expanding the traditionally enterprise brand's market to mainstream consumers. Running version 4.5 of BlackBerry OS, the Pearl supported the full range of BlackBerry enterprise functionality. Updated versions were released as Pearl 8110, 8120 and 8130.

Unlike previous BlackBerrys, the Pearl swapped the wide body and full QWERTY keyboard for a narrower, candybar style, and a hybrid keypad keyboard layout on a 4-row, 5-column keypad, with a proprietary predictive input algorithm called SureType. Most notably, the Pearl uses a titular translucent trackball that facilitates horizontal and vertical scrolling, instead of the traditional BlackBerry scroll wheel. The backlit color of the 8100 trackball is controlled by a series of LEDs and may be changed by software loaded on the phone; the 8110, 8120 and 8130 models trackball is lit only in white. The color customization capabilities also extend to the notification LED in the top right corner of the device. This LED can be programmed to blink different colors depending on which contact has called, texted or emailed.

The BlackBerry Pearl was a large sales success for RIM. In 2008, a Pearl flip phone, the 8200 series, was released, while in 2010 the successor to the original Pearl, the 3G Pearl 9100 series, was released.

== Features and versions ==
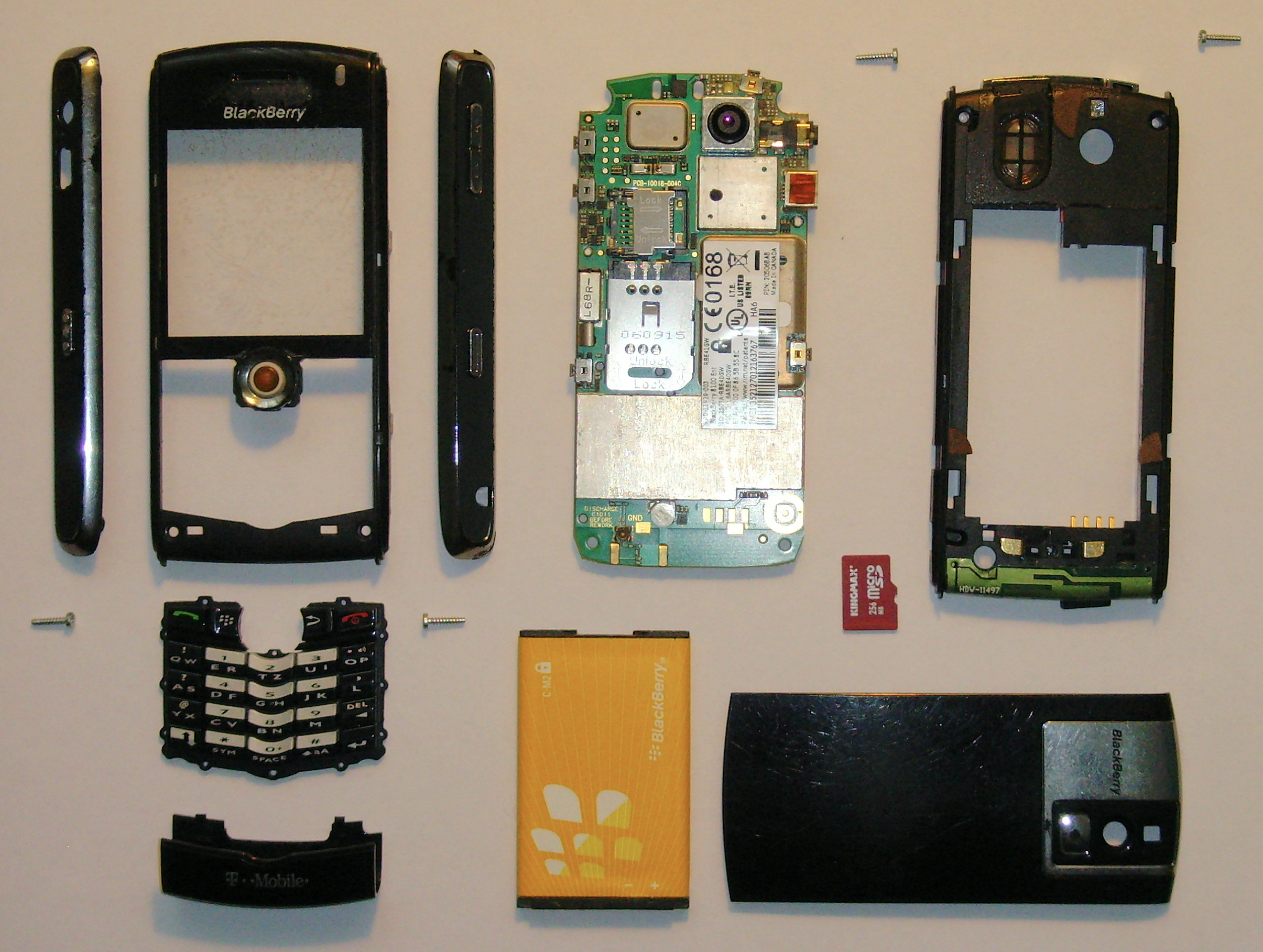
Disassembled BlackBerry Pearl revealing the hardware inside

The BlackBerry Pearl has quad-band network support on 850/900/1800/1900 MHz GSM/GPRS and EDGE networks to allow for international roaming between North America, Europe and Asia Pacific. The semi QWERTY keyboard layout previously appeared on the BlackBerry 7130. It is made up of two letters per key across five vertical rows, helping to significantly reduce the keyboard and device size compared to normal handsets with full keyboards.

The Pearl's media player has support for MP3, AAC/M4A, AMR, WMA, polyphonic MIDI, and WAV sound formats, as well as MPEG-4, Xvid, DivX, WMV and H.263 video formats. It also has a 1.33 (8100) or 2.0 (8110/8120/8130) megapixel camera with flash, self-portrait mirror, and 5x digital zoom.

In October 2007, RIM introduced updated versions of the 8100: the Pearl 8120 with support for Wi-Fi, improved 2 megapixel camera and other improvements, and the Pearl 8130 which is the CDMA network variant and includes EV-DO high speed data capabilities as well as GPS capability assisting BlackBerry Maps. In May 2008, the Pearl 8110 was introduced with GPS but without Wi-Fi.

BlackBerry Pearl 8110, 8120 and 8130 use the Antioch chip from Cypress Semiconductor, a Westbridge peripheral controller enabling "direct connection between peripherals, creating ultra-fast transfers". This upgrade from 8100 provides faster USB sideloading than older phones, and fast connection to the microSDHC card, capable of transferring 1 GB file in less than 70 seconds - over 16Mbyte/s transfer rate. This speed significantly surpasses that of the earlier iPhone, Motorola RAZR or Sony Ericsson Walkman.

== Release and reception ==
The BlackBerry Pearl is aimed towards both business users and consumers. Its advertising campaign features several people including Mariska Hargitay and Douglas Coupland.

=== Carriers ===
The Pearl was previously available with Entel PCS in Chile, Cellcom, Sprint, T-Mobile, AT&T Mobility, Cincinnati Bell Wireless, Verizon Wireless, Alltel, US Cellular, Centennial Wireless, MOSH Mobile, nTelos, Cellular One, Cellular South and BlueGrass Cellular in the United States; TIM, Vodafone and Wind in Italy; Turkcell and Avea in Turkey; Claro, Vivo in Brazil, Dominican Republic and Puerto Rico; Airtel, Vodafone and Reliance Communications in India; Iusacell, Telcel and Movistar in Mexico; Rogers Wireless, Telus, SaskTel, MTS, TBayTel, Bell Mobility, Wind Mobile, and Virgin Mobile Canada in Canada; Telstra, Optus and Vodafone in Australia; Indosat in Indonesia; KPN and Vodafone in the Netherlands; Globe Telecom in the Philippines; Grameenphone in Bangladesh; Vodafone in New Zealand; Singtel in Singapore; Mobilink in Pakistan and all networks in the UK; MTN, Globacom and Zain in Nigeria; Tigo, Comcel in Colombia; Movistar, Digicel, Claro and Cable & Wireless in Panama.

== Pearl Flip and Pearl 3G ==
=== Pearl Flip (8200 series) ===
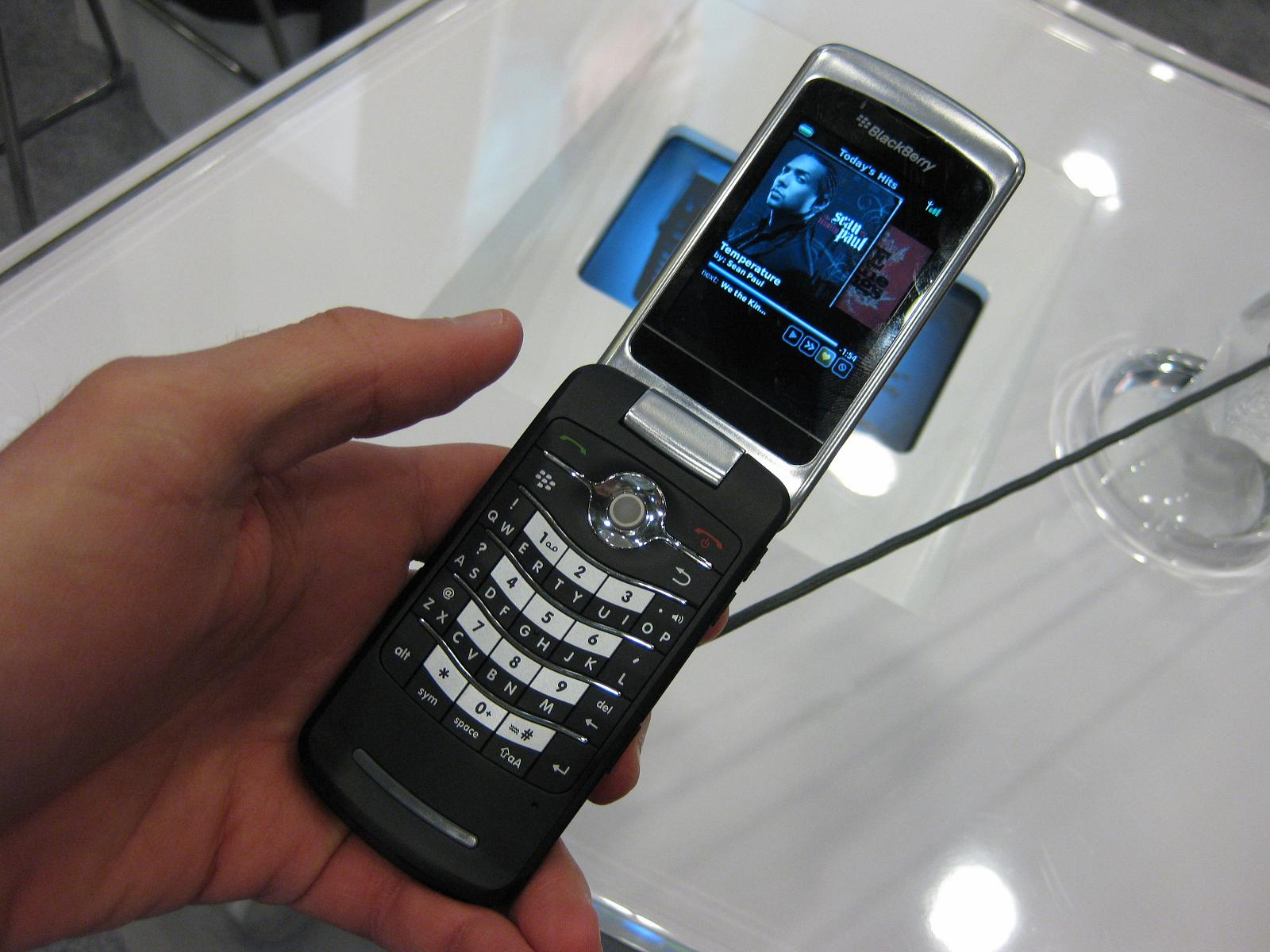
BlackBerry Pearl Flip 8220

The BlackBerry Pearl 8220, codenamed during development as the "KickStart", is RIM's first flip phone and announced on September 10, 2008. It is thus often referred to as the "Pearl Flip" or "BlackBerry Flip". The Pearl Flip is very similar to the original Pearl and uses the same predictive text input that the Pearl uses. It has a 2.0-megapixel camera and video recording. It has a 240x320 pixels, 2.6 inch display as well as a 128x160, 1.6 inch external display. A CDMA version was available for Verizon and Alltel known as the 8230.

=== Pearl 3G (9100 series) ===
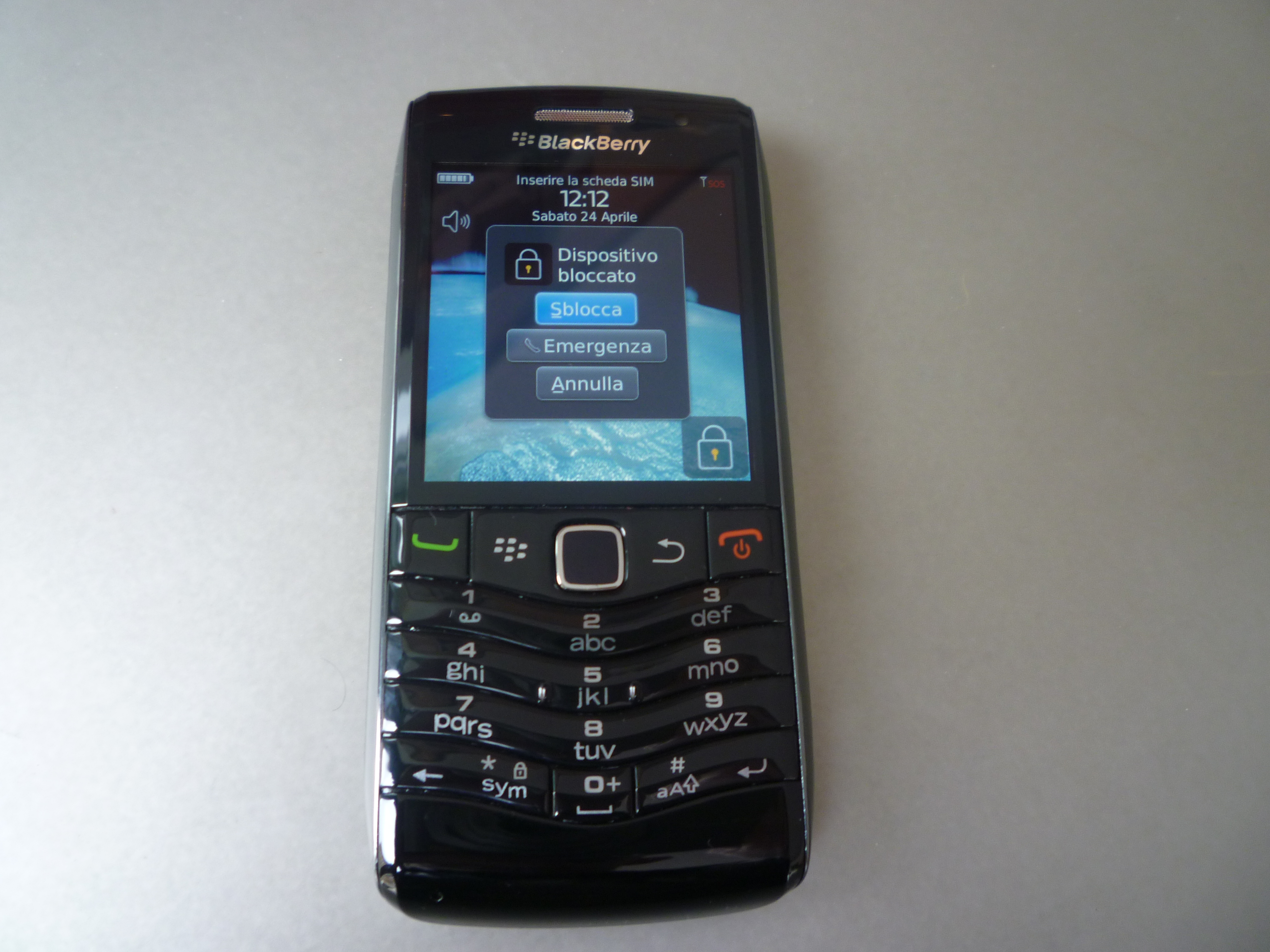
BlackBerry Pearl 3G 9105 (with alphanumerical keypad)

The BlackBerry Pearl 9100/9105, often referred to as "BlackBerry Pearl 3G", was announced on April 26, 2010. As the successor to the original Pearl, this new handset has 3G (HSDPA) network capability, a trackpad (first introduced in BlackBerry Curve 8520) and comes with a 360 x 400, 2.25" TFT display. The Pearl 3G features a hybrid QWERTY keyboard for the US market (the 9100 model) or a traditional alphanumeric keypad for some other regions (9105 model). It also utilises the SureType facility for predictive text with the option to use the traditional typing method.
