= BlackBerry Curve 9220 =

Keypad smartphones manufactured by BlackBerry (RIM)

BlackBerry Curve 9220 / 9320
- Brand: BlackBerry
- Manufacturer: Research in Motion
- Type: Smartphone
- Series: BlackBerry Curve
- First released: Curve 9220: April 2012; Curve 9320: May 2012
- Availability by region: Curve 9220: Indonesia: April 24, 2012; Philippines: May 22, 2012; Latin America: May 25, 2012; Kenya: July 13, 2012; Curve 9320: Latin America: May 25, 2012; Kenya: July 13, 2012
- Discontinued: Yes
- Predecessor: BlackBerry Curve 8520 / 9300
- Compatible networks: GSM / HSPA
- Form factor: Candybar with physical QWERTY keyboard
- Colors: (Black); (Fuchsia Pink); (Pure White / White); (Teal Blue); for colors
- Dimensions: 109 mm (4.3 in) H / 60 mm (2.4 in) W / 12.7 mm (0.50 in) D
- Weight: Curve 9220: 102 g (3.6 oz); Curve 9320: 103 g (3.6 oz)
- Operating system: BlackBerry OS 7.1
- CPU: 800 MHz
- Memory: 512 MB RAM
- Storage: 512 MB ROM
- Removable storage: microSDHC (dedicated slot)
- SIM: Mini-SIM
- Battery: Removable Li-Ion 1450 mAh battery (J-S1)
- Rear camera: Curve 9220: 2 MP; Curve 9320: 3.15 MP with AF
- Front camera: None
- Display: TFT, 65K colors, 2.44 inches, 320 x 240 pixels (~164 ppi density)
- Water resistance: None
- Model: Curve 9220 (RDS41LW / RDV21CW), Curve 9320 (RDW41UW)

The BlackBerry Curve 9220 and Curve 9320 are entry-level smartphones developed and manufactured by Research in Motion. It was released in April 2012 for the Curve 9220 and May 2012 for the Curve 9320.

== Availability and reception ==
It was launched on April 24, 2012 in Indonesia. It was rolled out to other territories starting with the Philippines on May 22, Latin America on May 25 and Kenya on July 13.

In Manila, an exclusive concert was held on July 11, which was hosted by Nicki Minaj at the Pink Friday Tour in SM Mall of Asia Arena for BlackBerry subscribers.

== Features ==
The keypad is similar to 9360, 9300 and 8520 models. It has a display of 2.44-inch TFT display supporting 65K colors at a resolution of 320 x 240 pixels (~164 ppi density).

Both models run on an 800 MHz processor and are equipped with 512 MB of RAM and 512 MB of ROM storage with expandable storage expanded via a dedicated microSDHC card slot. It was powered by a removable 1450 mAh Li-Ion battery (J-S1).

Both smartphones run on BlackBerry OS 7.1. Additionally, the Curve 9320 features a dedicated physical BBM (BlackBerry Messenger) key on its side.

The Curve 9220 is limited to 2G GSM/EDGE networks and features a 2-megapixel fixed-focus rear camera, whereas the Curve 9320 introduces HSPA 3G connectivity and upgrades the rear camera to 3.15 megapixels.
