= BlackBerry Electron =

Smart phone series

- Compatible networks: CDMA, GSM
- Dimensions: 110×69.5×19.5 mm (4.33×2.74×0.77 in)
- Weight: 134 g (5 oz)
- Operating system: BlackBerry OS
- Memory: 64MB
- Battery: Talk time Up to 4 h, Stand-by Up to 450 h
- Display: 65K colors, 320 x 240 pixels, 2.6 inches (66 mm)
- Connectivity: Bluetooth, USB (with Mass Storage Mode support)
- Development status: Discontinued

The BlackBerry Electron (8703/8700/8707) is a discontinued BlackBerry smartphone developed by Research In Motion Ltd and released in 2005.

== Launch ==
The Blackberry Electron was announced in Q4 of 2004. It was formally launched in the fall of 2005. The gross profit reported by RIM's income statement, as of March 2006 (about four months after the release of the Electron), was US$1.3 billion.

== Manufacturing ==
Most of the materials that make up the BlackBerry Electron and other BlackBerry devices, such as flexible circuit boards, were manufactured in China.

The BlackBerry Election weighed 134 g (4.73 oz), the dimensions of the device were 110 by 69.5 by 19.5mm (4.33 x 2.74 x 0.77 in), with a QWERTY keyboard configuration and a 320 by 240 pixel LCD with a 16-bit (65K colors) colour depth. It had a loudspeaker and contained 3 different alert types: Vibration; Polyphonic, MP3 ringtones. It did not contain a 3.5mm jack. The memory was fixed at 64 MB storage, and 16 MB RAM. The Electron had a Lithium-Ion 1100 mAh battery. Which would last up to 450 hours on Stand-By time, and up to 4 hours in Talk time.

== Software ==
=== Interface ===
The BlackBerry Electron features a graphical interface and uses menus and icons for navigation.

=== Music and ringtones ===
All 8700 series phones come with MP3 ringtone support. Saved songs can be played.

== Network ==
The 3 versions of the Electron had differences in network support – the original (8700) model supported Quad-band GSM (EDGE/GPRS).

The 8707 (AKA "UMTS Electron") added 2100 MHz UMTS 3G and the 8703 model was designed for US CDMA operators and supported both 850 MHz and 1900 MHz CDMA2K (EvDO/1xRTT) – the 8703 also has A-GPS support, which was not present on the GSM/UMTS variants.

All variants have Bluetooth, and USB facilities.

The quad-band network (on the 8700 and 8707, but not the 8703) was the network available for international travelers in 2005–2006. The Electron uses a mini-SIM.
