= Kodak EasyShare C300 =

The Kodak EasyShare C300 is a 3.2 megapixel digital camera from Kodak, and is part of the Kodak EasyShare line. It can take pictures in color, black and white, and sepia tones. The largest printable picture size is 11×14 inches. The camera also takes videos, up to 30 seconds in length. The video camera mode has no sound; nor does it use Sharing Mode associated with other EasyShare cameras.
