= BlackBerry Charm =

Mobile phone

The BlackBerry Charm (7100 series) is a discontinued smartphone made by BlackBerry Limited, then known as Research In Motion. The Charm was equipped with SureType technology, which used predictive type to allow for normal QWERTY-style typing using only 20 keys. It featured a 240x260 pixel display, polyphonic ringtones, quad-band GSM radio, and Bluetooth. The original 7100t (T-Mobile) was released in 2004, with the 7100r (Rogers), 7100v (Vodafone), 7100g (Cingular / AT&T Wireless), 7100x (O2), and 7100i (NEXTEL / Sprint) being released later.

== See also ==
- List of BlackBerry products
