= BlackBerry Quark =

Series of smart phones launched in 2003

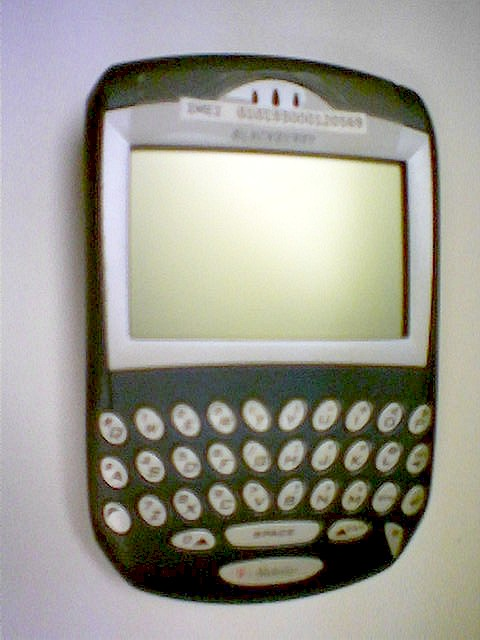
- BlackBerry Quark 6230
- Also known as: RIM Quark
- First released: June, 2003
- Compatible networks: GSM900 and GSM1900
- Dimensions: 75 x 113 x 20 mm, 3 x 4.4 x 0.8 inches
- Weight: 136 g (5 oz) (including battery)
- Operating system: RIM BlackBerry OS 3.x (originally); RIM Blackberry OS 4.0.2 (latest)
- Memory: 2 MB SRAM, 16 MB flash
- Battery: Lithium-ion battery
- Display: 160 x 100 (16000 pixels)
- Connectivity: USB (with Mass Storage Mode support)
- Development status: Discontinued

The BlackBerry Quark (6210 / 6220 / 6230 / 6280) is a discontinued series of business-focused smartphones developed by Research In Motion. Launched in 2003, it was one of the most popular first-generation BlackBerry models.

It was the first BlackBerry device that could make calls without a headset attached.

== Specification ==
The specification of devices in the series includes:

- ARM7EJ-S CPU: 32-bit, single-core (1999)
- 2 MB SRAM
- 16 MB flash
- 160 x 100 monochrome LCD
- USB (with Mass Storage Mode support)
- 34-key QWERTY keyboard
- Built-in speakerphone
- SMS
- Lithium-ion rechargeable battery

== Reception ==
Time magazine listed the BlackBerry Quark among its All-Time Top 100 Gadgets in 2010.
