= PocketGenie =

- Developer(s): WolfeTech Corporation
- Initial release: 1997
- Final release: 3.2
- Platform: BlackBerry, Motorola, SkyTel, PalmPilot, Windows CE devices
- Type: Business collaborative software, Finance
- License: Trialware

PocketGenie was an embedded wireless application developed for two-way pagers in 1997. At the time WAP was commonplace for mobile services; PocketGenie utilized HTML and URL links. It was the first commercial wireless service for RIM (BlackBerry) and Motorola.

WolfeTech was founded by Surya Jayaweera (CEO) in January 1997. Jayaweera developed PocketGenie in November 1996. Two days later, he drove to COMDEX and pitched the idea to Motorola. Its approval led to the start of WolfeTech. PocketGenie was announced to the public in 1997.

PocketGenie was a text-based software before it upgraded to an icon based GUI in 2000. Users could type keywords into the software's menu to access the Internet services of WolfeTech's business partners; users could check stock reports, news headlines, get driving directions or purchase assorted goods. Later versions made improvements to business transactions and included a multilingual translator. Over 200 different services were provided. A companion software PocketInternet permitted global web browsing and full HTML functionality.

PC Mag gave PocketGenie a good performance rating but noted its sluggish lag times in its review. In 2011, the trademark for PocketGenie expired.
