= SureType =

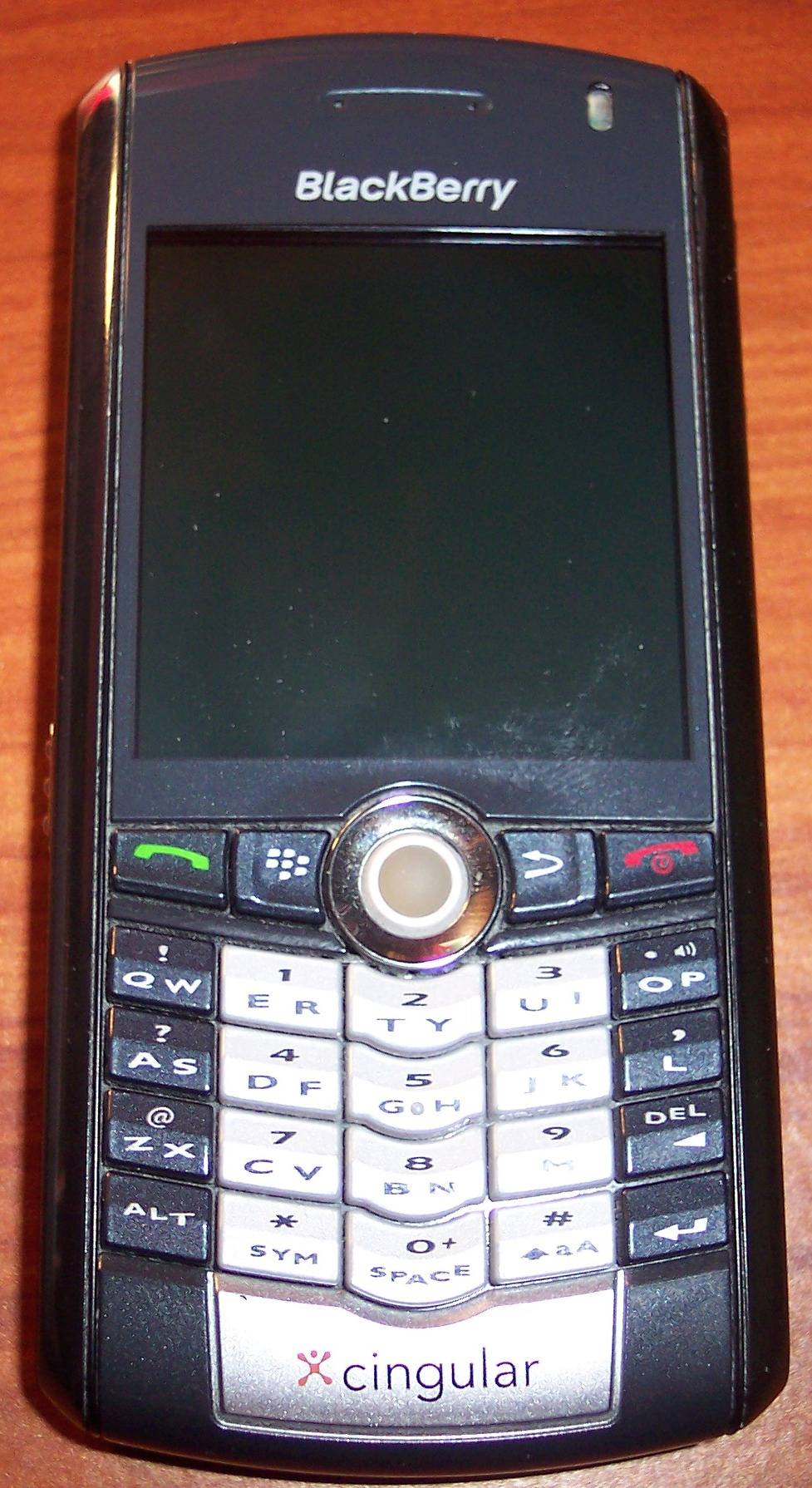
A BlackBerry Pearl with SureType. Note the extra columns. The ! key represents Q and W, the 1 key E and R, the 9 key M.

SureType is a QWERTY-based character input method for cell phones. SureType was developed by BlackBerry vendor Research in Motion and was used on the BlackBerry Charm and the BlackBerry Pearl. SureType combines a traditional telephone keypad with a QWERTY-based keyboard to create a non-standard way to input text on a cell phone. In addition, SureType contains a list of 35,000 English words, so when a user types the beginning of a word, all the possible words which start with those letters show up on the screen. Additional words can also be added to the word list.

== See also ==
- T9 (predictive text), a predictive text input technology for mobile phones
