= BlackBerry Curve =

Smartphone

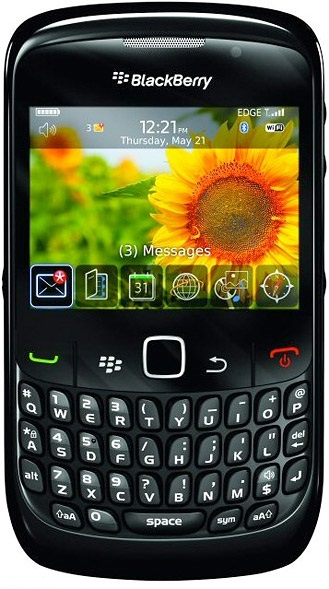
- Manufacturer: Research In Motion
- Availability by region: 2007–2013
- Predecessor: BlackBerry Pearl 8100 series
- Successor: BlackBerry Q5; BlackBerry Z3; BlackBerry Leap
- Operating system: BlackBerry OS
- Data inputs: QWERTY
- Development status: Discontinued
- Website: blackberry.com on the Wayback Machine: Curve 83xx; Curve 8900; Curve 85xx; Curve 3G 93xx

The BlackBerry Curve was a brand of entry-level and mid-range smartphones that were manufactured by Research in Motion from 2007 until 2013.

The Curve lineup improves upon the BlackBerry Pearl as BlackBerry's consumer oriented devices and is positioned below the BlackBerry Bold. The Curve had plastic and glossy materials compared to the metal and leather in the Bold lineup, and has a different keyboard design, where the individual buttons are more rounded and spaced, reminiscent of the earlier BlackBerry phones and the original two-way pager. There were two basic form factors within the Curve line: the original, thicker form factor on the 8900, 8500 and 9300 series, and the slimmer form factor of the 9350 and 9380 model. The 9380 is the first and only Curve with a touchscreen.

== Early series ==
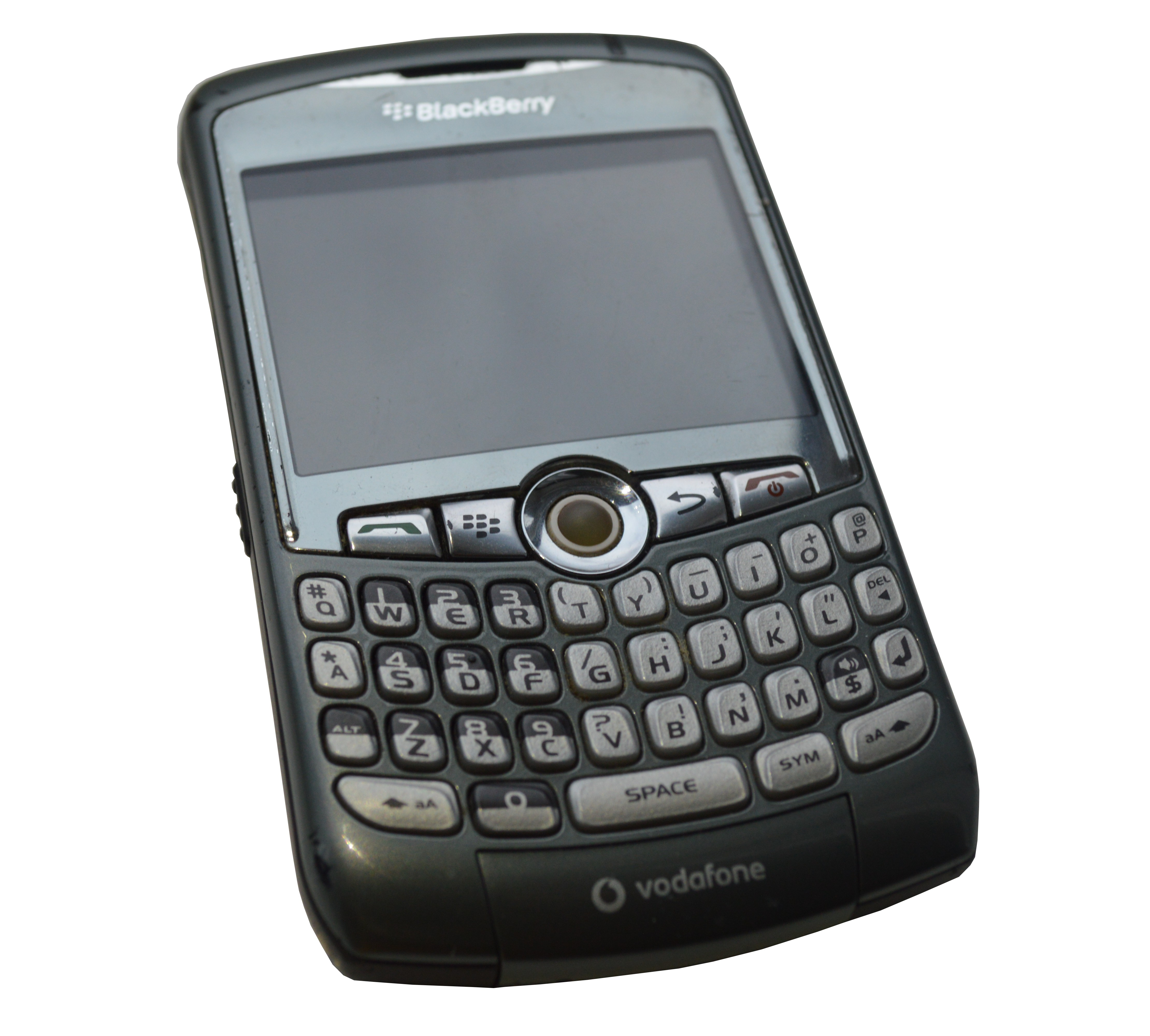
BlackBerry Curve 8310

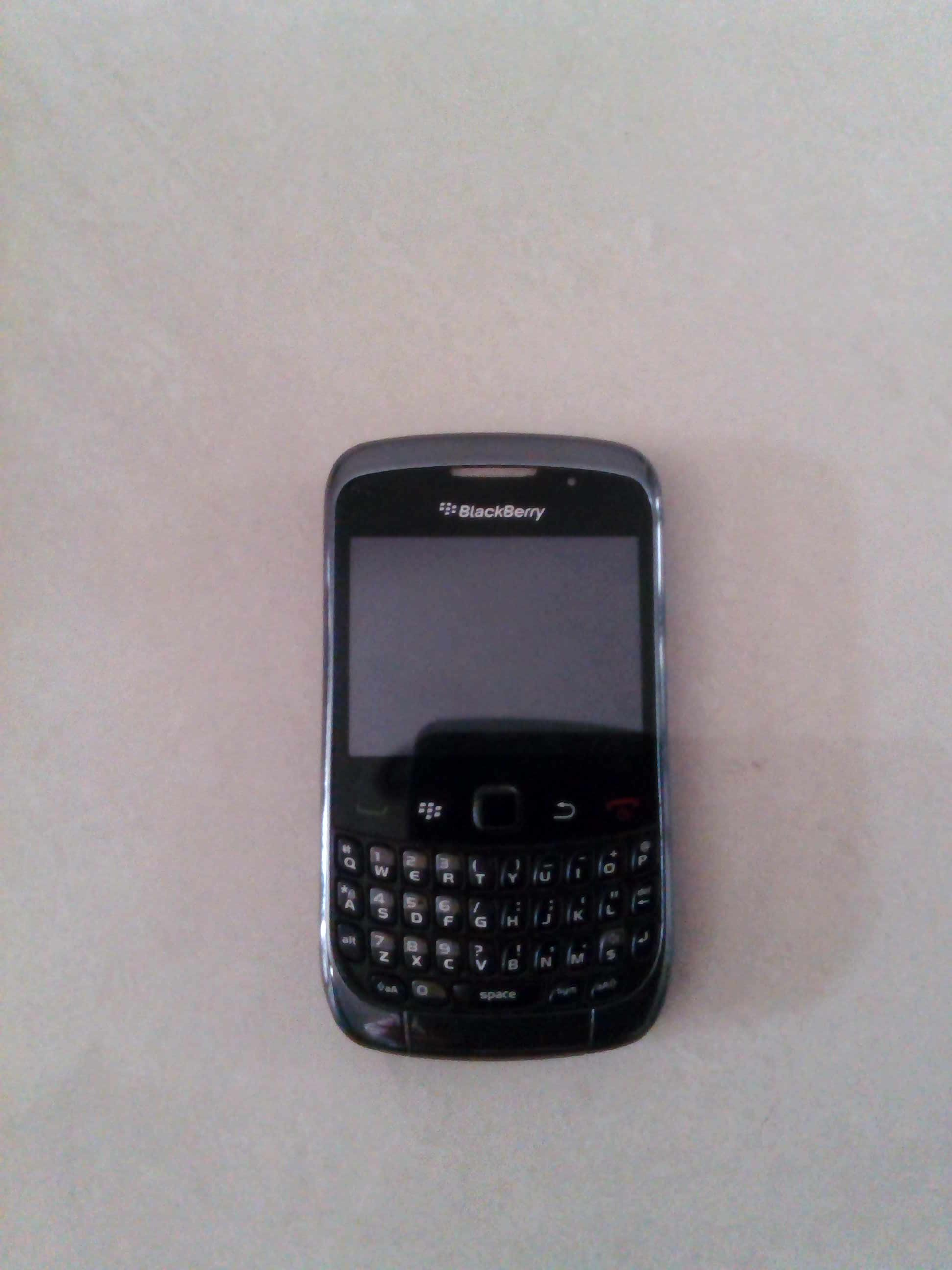
BlackBerry Curve 9330, front side

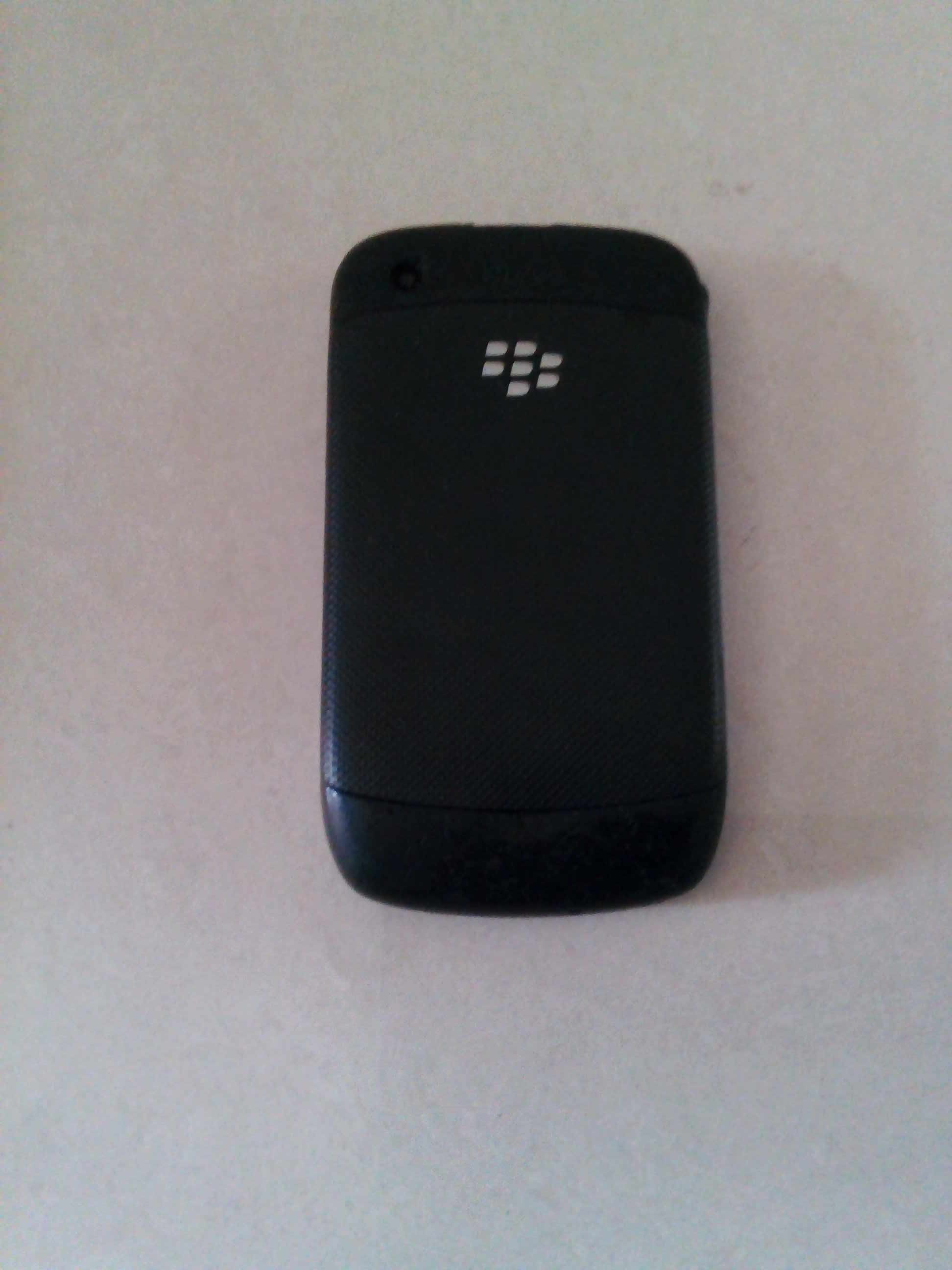
BlackBerry Curve 9330, back side

=== Original series (8300) ===
The original model, Curve 8300, was introduced on May 3, 2007, with version 4.5 of BlackBerry OS. The Curve lineup continued the "consumer-oriented" philosophy of the BlackBerry Pearl and 8800 series, and included multimedia features and a built-in camera. As was customary for BlackBerry devices, the 8300 series consisted of several models offered by different wireless providers, supporting that provider's network along with specific services. The 8300 was launched alongside the business-oriented 8800 series, which lacks a camera like earlier BlackBerry models.

In total, 5 variants were released; 8300, 8310, 8320, 8330 and 8350i. The 8300, 8310, and 8320 are able to support North American and European GSM technologies. Later in 2007, the 8310 was launched with GPS.

At the end of 2007, Research in Motion announced the 8320 featuring Wi-Fi but lacking a GPS receiver.

In early 2008, which is Verizon Wireless and Research in Motion the first CDMA Curve, the Curve 8330. This phone also featured upgraded memory as well and GPS. It only served the 800/1900 MHz range for CDMA2000 and 1xEV-DO. It was also the first Curve to have video recording at 240 x 176 resolution in 3GP format.

The 8350i was the last of the 8300 series to come out, which supported the 800/900 MHz iDEN and Push-to-Talk. It had 128 MB of memory and weighed 135g.

CNET gave the Curve an "Excellent" rating. However, they found the Curve 8300's lack of 3G and Wi-Fi disappointing. Also disappointing was the phone's lack of video-recording capabilities. Call quality was determined to be subpar and calls sounded hollow on the Curve 8300. While the 8300 as originally released lacked Video Recording and Voice Note Recording, these functions have been provided with the Blackberry OS 4.5 release.

=== Curve 8900 ===
The BlackBerry 8900, also codenamed "Javelin" for Asian markets, was released in November 2008 with OS version 5.0 as a quad-band GSM/GPRS/EDGE phone and named the Curve 8900. The device is an upgrade over the older 8300 model, with the most significant differences being a 3.2-megapixel camera, a micro-USB port, Wi-Fi, and an upgraded operating system.

The initial release was in November 2008 in the UK & Canada, though it later released in the US in February 2009 on T-Mobile, and later on AT&T as well. China Mobile versions were released the 8910 in 2010 and 2011 the 8980. The 8910 is identical except for the removal of wifi to comply with Chinese regulations at the time. The 8980 design is radically different from the 8900 or 8910; its design cues are virtually identical to the Blackberry Bold 9700/9780/9788 series but lacking 3G capabilities; the 8980's keyboard is the typical Curve "chicklet".

While not as positive as other BlackBerry phones, the reviews of the Curve 8900 were mostly positive with praise for the improvements made over previous models but was criticized for the lack of 3G and a relatively slow processor. The 8900 was also praised for its new, stylish and confident look.

=== Curve 8500 Series ===
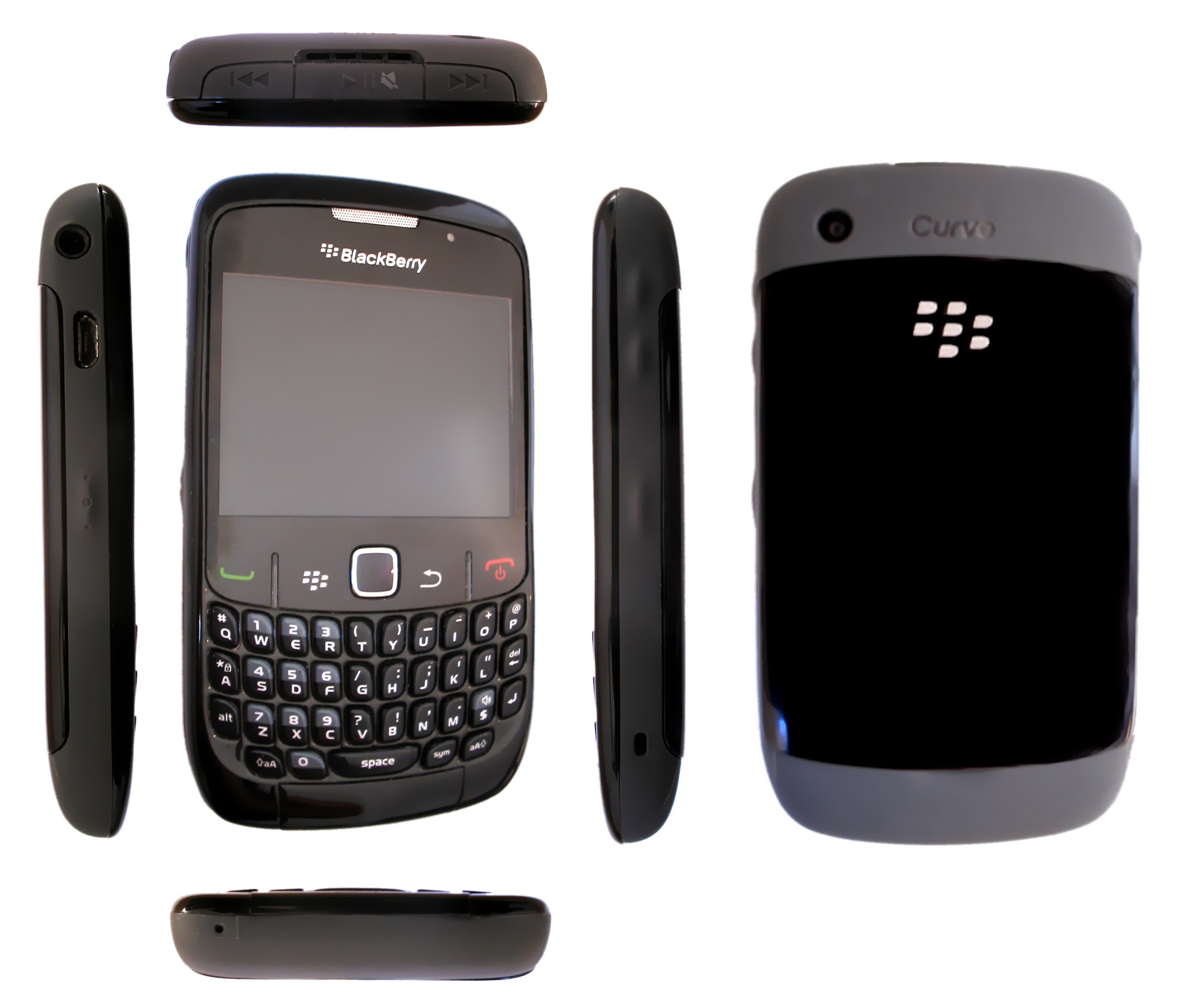
BlackBerry Curve 8520, the first BlackBerry with a trackpad

The BlackBerry Curve 8500 series was announced in July 2009 and released the following August with OS version 5.0. This series continued Research in Motion's developing "consumer-oriented" philosophy of the BlackBerry Pearl and the 8300 series smartphones with the inclusion of additional multimedia features. It was also the first BlackBerry to introduce the trackpad, replacing the trackball used in previous models. A CDMA version was released as the Curve 8530. The 8500 series was notably popular in Indonesia, where it was referred to after its internal codename "Gemini", and gained a cult status within the country's then-growing smartphone culture.

=== Curve 9300 ===
The BlackBerry Curve 9300 was the first Curve device that supports 3G networks. The 9300, and its CDMA counterpart, the Curve 9330, also contained some minor improvements over the previous 8500 series including a faster processor and the ability to upgrade the OS to BlackBerry 6. The BlackBerry Curve 9300 also continued with the dedicated media keys on the top first introduced with the 8500 series. The Curve 9300 was released on Rogers Wireless in Canada on August 4, 2010.

== BlackBerry 7 series ==
=== BlackBerry Curve 9350/9360/9370 ===
The Curve 9350/9360/9370 are mid-range models in the Curve series announced in August 2011 and released September 2011 with OS version 7.1. The Curve 9350 series has a slimmer, lighter-weight design with improved technical specifications over the Curve 9300 series and also runs BlackBerry OS 7.1. The 9370 is a CDMA/GSM World Edition, the 9360 is a 3G GSM/HSPA+ variant, and the 9350 is a CDMA only variant. The series of phones includes a 5-megapixel camera with an LED flash and uses an 800mhz single core processor.

All the phones include NFC, Wi-Fi Calling and FM radio with the OS 7.1 upgrade. The 9370 has more eMMC memory than its siblings at 1 GB as compared to 512 MB. An HSPA+ (incorrectly called 4G) version was available with select carriers eventually.

=== BlackBerry Curve 9380 Series ===
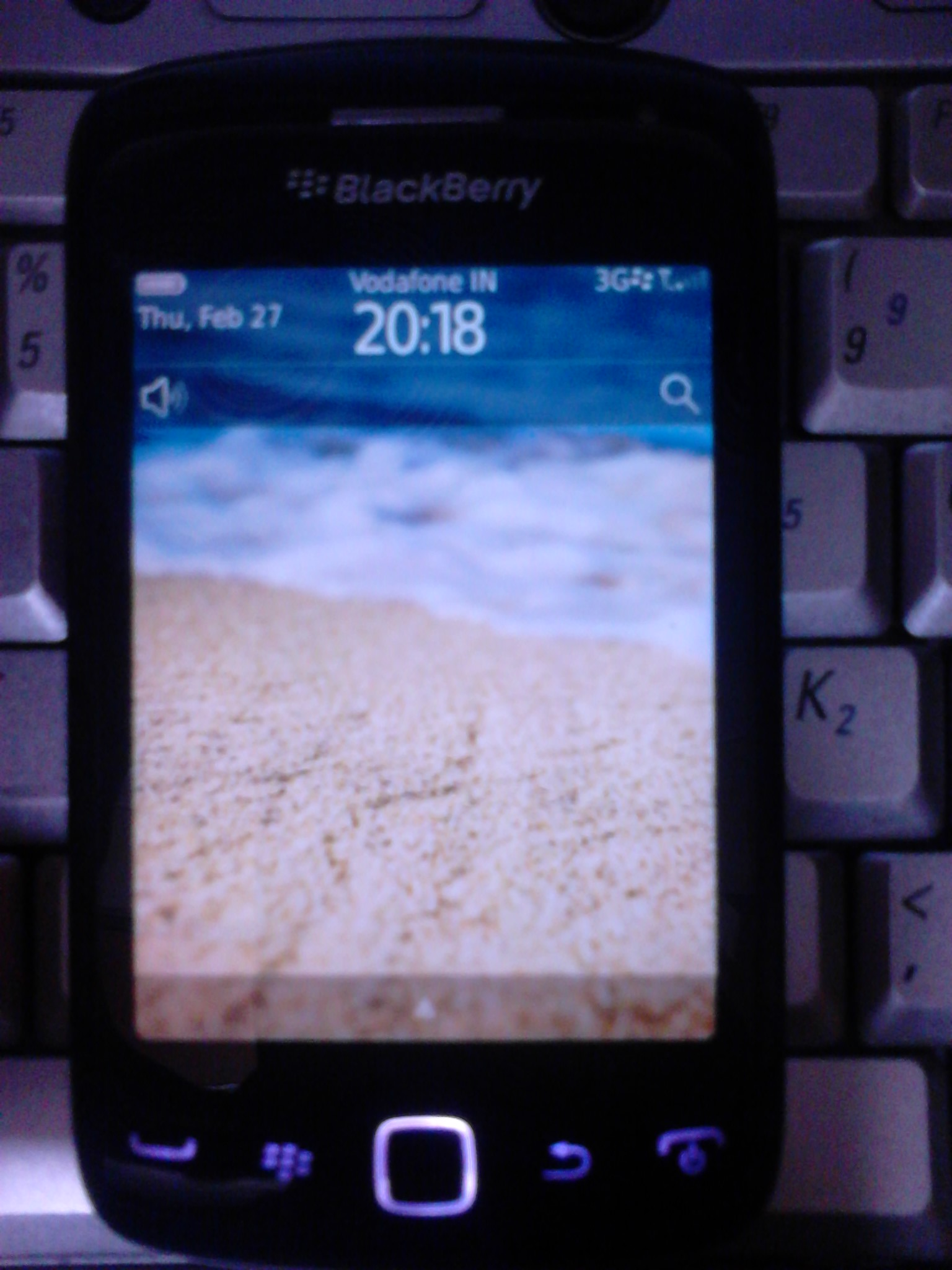
BlackBerry Curve 9380

The BlackBerry Curve 9380, announced in November 2011, was the first Curve device with a touchscreen instead of a physical keyboard. It was designed to be a budget counterpart to Torch 9860, which is similarly an all-touchscreen BlackBerry. Like the Torch lineup, the 9380 comes with a capacitive touchscreen, as opposed to the clickable "SurePress" screen as seen on the Storm.

TechRadar gave the Curve 9380 three out of five stars, complimenting its affordability, the quality of its screen, its design for being more comfortable and not as fragile as other smartphones, and the improvements in the 7.0 operating system. However, reviewers also felt the device felt unstable, its social networking integration was of inconsistent quality, the implementation of BlackBerry OS on a touchscreen device wasn't as elegant or mature as other smartphone platforms, and concluded that the phone "[isn't the] best option in its price range."

For select markets, the Curve 9380 was succeeded by the BlackBerry Z3 and the Leap as BlackBerry's budget touchscreen device.

=== BlackBerry Curve 9220/9310/9320/9321 ===
Introduced in 2012, this lineup are entry-level models developed mainly for developing economies and budget-conscious consumers, serving as successor models to the 8500 series. They are stripped-down versions of the mid-range Curve 9350/60/70 series, with a lower resolution screen, lower camera resolution and thicker design, but with a higher capacity battery (1,450mAh, as opposed to 1,000mAh in the 9350 series). Unique features include a dedicated BlackBerry Messenger shortcut button and FM radio, the latter being the first for a BlackBerry smartphone. The 9320 and 9321 (codenamed "Armstrong") supports 3G and GPS, and were released in May 2012. The 9310 was a CDMA variant released in July 2012. The 9220 (nicknamed "Davis") was launched first in India on April 19, 2012 with lower specifications, having a 2 MP camera, lacking a GPS, and only supports 2G. All models in this lineup comes with 512 MB RAM and storage.

=== BlackBerry 9720 ===
The BlackBerry 9720 (codenamed "Samoa") was an entry-level model released in August 2013 and the final device running BlackBerry OS 7, targeted primarily towards emerging markets. Despite not officially being part of the Curve lineup, it shares similarities to the preceding Curve models, featuring the same RAM and storage capacity (512 MB), a similar keyboard design, as well as the fixed-focus camera. It also features a touchscreen, similar to that of the higher end Q5 and the previous Bold 9900.

== Model comparison ==
The following tables highlight features of the different models.

=== Early series ===
Curve Series		8300 Series	8900 Series		8500 Series		9300 Series	
Picture								
Available Models		8300, 8310, 8320, 8330, and 8350i	8900	8980	8520	8530	9300	9330
Display		320 × 240 px	480 × 360 px, 2.4" (built on 100 μm pixel)		320 × 240 px			
Data Inputs		Keyboard, trackball			Keyboard, optical trackpad			
CPU speed		312 MHz	512 MHz				624 MHz	
Memory	Internal	64 MB	256 MB					512 MB
Memory	RAM	8310: 16 MB; 8350: 64 MB; Others: 32 MB	128 MB				512 MB	512 MB
Removable Storage		microSD card						
Compatible networks		Various 2G (Note: The BlackBerry Curve 8300, 8310 and 8320 use a 2G GSM network. The 8330 uses a CDMA network, while the 8350i uses an iDEN network.)	2G GSM			CDMA	3G HSPA	CDMA
Connectivity	Bluetooth	Bluetooth 2.0 + A2DP				Bluetooth 2.1 + A2DP		
Connectivity	GPS	Partial	Yes	Yes	No	Yes	Yes	Yes
Connectivity	NFC	No	No	No	No	No	No	No
Connectivity	USB	miniUSB 2.0	microUSB					
Connectivity	Camera resolution		2.0 MP	3.2 MP		2.0 MP		
Battery capacity		1150 mAh	1400 mAh		1150 mAh			
Operating System		BlackBerry OS 5					BlackBerry OS 6	
Java support								
Released (US)		May 10, 2007 (Note: The BlackBerry Curve 8350i was released about a year and a half later on December 15th, 2008.)	February 11, 2009		August 5, 2009	November 20, 2009	September 15, 2010	
Weight		110g (3.9 oz)	109.9g (3.9 oz)		105g (3.7 oz)		104/106g (3.7 oz)	

=== BlackBerry 7 series ===
Curve Series		9350 Series			9380 Series	9220 Series	9320 Series
Picture							
Available Models		9350	9360	9370	9380	9220	9320
Display		480 x 360 px, 2.4" (built on 100 μm pixel)			480 x 360 px, 3.2" (built on 140 μm pixel)	320 x 240 pixels, 2.4", (built on 150 μm pixel)	
Data Inputs		Keyboard, optical trackpad			Touchscreen, optical trackpad	Keyboard, optical trackpad	
CPU		800 MHz					
Memory	Internal	512 MB		1 GB	512 MB		
Memory	RAM	512 MB					
Removable Storage		microSDHC card					
Compatible networks		3G CDMA	3G HSPA	3G CDMA/2G GSM	3G HSPA	2G GSM	3.5G HSDPA
Connectivity	Bluetooth	Bluetooth 2.1 + A2DP					
Connectivity	GPS	Yes	Yes	Yes	Yes	No	Yes
Connectivity	NFC	Yes	Yes	Yes	Yes	No	No
Connectivity	USB	microUSB					
Connectivity	Wi-Fi	802.11b/g/n					
Connectivity	Camera resolution	5.0 MP				2.0 MP	3.2 MP
Connectivity	Battery capacity	1000 mAhr			1230 mAhr	1450 mAh	
Released (US)		August 2011			April 2012	July 2012	
Operating System (US)		BlackBerry OS 7					
Weight		99g (3.5 oz)			98 g	102 g	103 g
