= IWireless =

Defunct American mobile network operator

Iowa Wireless Services LLC d.b.a. iWireless
- Type: Private (Limited liability partnership between T-Mobile US, Inc. and Iowa Network Services Inc.)
- Predecessor: Iowa Wireless Services L.P.
- Founded: 1997
- Defunct: 1 October 2018
- Fate: Acquired by T-Mobile US
- Successor: Metro by T-Mobile
- Headquarters: Urbandale, Iowa, U.S.
- Number of locations: 250
- Area served: Iowa western Illinois eastern Nebraska
- Services: No Contract Plans; Freedom Plans; Unlimited Data
- Number of employees: 200
- Parent: T-Mobile US, Inc.
- Website: iwireless.com

Iowa Wireless Services LLC, doing business as iWireless, was a mobile network operator founded in 1997, not related to Kroger's service. Headquartered in Urbandale, Iowa, iWireless was a partnership between T-Mobile US, Inc. and Iowa Network Services Inc. iWireless owned licenses to operate GSM cellular networks in the PCS-1900 and AWS-1700 radio frequency bands covering Iowa, southwestern Wisconsin and northwestern Illinois. iWireless had over 250 full-service company stores and authorized dealers across Iowa, western Illinois, and eastern Nebraska. iWireless was acquired in full by T-Mobile and on October 1, 2018, the service was shut down as customers were encouraged to migrate to T-Mobile plans.

== History ==
iWireless was founded in 1997 as Iowa Wireless Services L.P., a joint venture between Western Wireless Corp. and Iowa Network Services Inc., a consortium of 127 Iowa independent telecommunications companies. The joint venture was formed to expand PCS throughout Iowa, marketing services under the VoiceStream Wireless brand name.

T-Mobile will acquire the remaining shares from Aureon (the successor company to Iowa Network Services) by the end of 2017/beginning of 2018.

T-Mobile acquired iWireless, and service on the iWireless network was discontinued on 10/01/2018.

== Network ==
=== Radio frequency summary ===
Frequencies used on the iWireless Network
Frequency Range	Band Number	Protocol	Class
1900 MHz PCS	2	GSM/GPRS/EDGE	2G
1700/2100 MHz AWS	4	UMTS/HSPA	3G
1900 MHz PCS	2	LTE	4G

iWireless operated GSM cellular networks in the PCS-1900 and AWS-1700/2100 radio frequency bands primarily in Iowa, but also owned licenses covering the Quad Cities area of western Illinois, southwestern Wisconsin and North Sioux City, South Dakota. In certain rural areas iWireless was the only GSM provider, providing roaming services for AT&T, T-Mobile USA, and other GSM carriers.

iWireless added coverage in and immediately surrounding Sioux City, Iowa, in June 2006, and planned to add approximately 100 new cell sites mainly in western Iowa throughout 2007, and planned to add 120 new towers throughout the Iowa, Illinois, South Dakota, and the Wisconsin areas. In some rural areas they were the only GSM provider, and also provided roaming services for AT&T, T-Mobile USA, and other smaller GSM carriers. iWireless was criticized for their relatively small coverage area compared to larger carriers, as well as long-distance charges for calls outside of their coverage area on local plans.

iWireless continued to expand their high-speed voice and data coverage in 2010 adding almost 100 new towers across Iowa and western Illinois. Area cell towers that were added during 2010 included: Sioux City, Southeastern Iowa, Southwestern Iowa, Mason City, Garner, Waterloo/Cedar Falls, Cedar Rapids, Burlington, Quad Cities, Dubuque, Iowa City, and Fort Dodge.

In September 2010, iWireless launched their statewide 3G UMTS/HSPA network. The network transmitted in the Advanced Wireless Services radio frequency band that is also used by T-Mobile USA.

iWireless and T-Mobile USA announced on October 1, 2012, that iWireless had acquired the rights to sell and operate service in the Des Moines market. In the past, T-Mobile had operated the metro area network as part of its nationwide network.

iWireless launched its 4G LTE network in November 2015 and expanded the network in 2016 and 2017.

== Services ==
iWireless offers No Contract (Paid in Advance) plans with unlimited Nationwide Talk, Text, and Data, that require no contracts, credit checks, or deposits. They also offer Freedom Plans and installment payment options to credit-qualified customers.

iWireless customers have access to nationwide 4G LTE data coverage through a partnership with T-Mobile. 4G LTE coverage is available in Waterloo/Cedar Falls, Cedar Rapids, Iowa City, Quad Cities, Des Moines, and other areas in Iowa. iWireless also has roaming agreements with virtually every GSM provider in the United States.

In 2012, they added 4G coverage (HSPA+) in over 208 cities (through T-Mobile) and in larger Iowa cities including Mason City, Osage, Rockwell, Davenport, Des Moines and more Iowa cities. In Q1 of 2013, they started a large 4G rollout in their coverage area. Areas that have been updated include the following locations: Forest City, Lake Mills, Thompson, Clear Lake, and other cities.

=== LTE ===
In March 2015, iWireless signed a contract with Nokia Networks, stating it will head a major update to iWireless' 2G, 3G, 4G and making an LTE network in July. The deal stated it will include the use of Nokia Network's Single RAN Advanced platform and Flexi Multiradio 10 base stations to support 2G, 3G, and LTE services, its Evolved Packet Core network to upgrade iWireless’ current packet core to support LTE; and Nokia's Subscriber Data Management system "to provide access to subscriber data and support the launch of new services." Nokia Networks will also handle network implementation, planning and optimization. Nokia Networks stated that it is the sole supplier of iWireless' radio and core network in support of their legacy 2G network and 3G/4G HSPA+ services, with the latest expansion maintaining that exclusive relationship. The updates and LTE equipment is expected to help iWireless maintain network relationships with other mobile operators, including a nationwide roaming deal with T-Mobile US.

On November 26, 2015, iWireless launched LTE service in Eastern Iowa. LTE coverage will expand in Iowa through 2017.

== Products ==
iWireless offered Apple brand smartphones as well as some other popular smartphones. Products like the iPhone 6S, iPhone 6S Plus, Samsung Galaxy S7, the Nexus 5 by Google, as well as more affordable smartphones.
