= Kodak DX7590 Zoom Digital Camera =

Digital camera model

Kodak DX7590
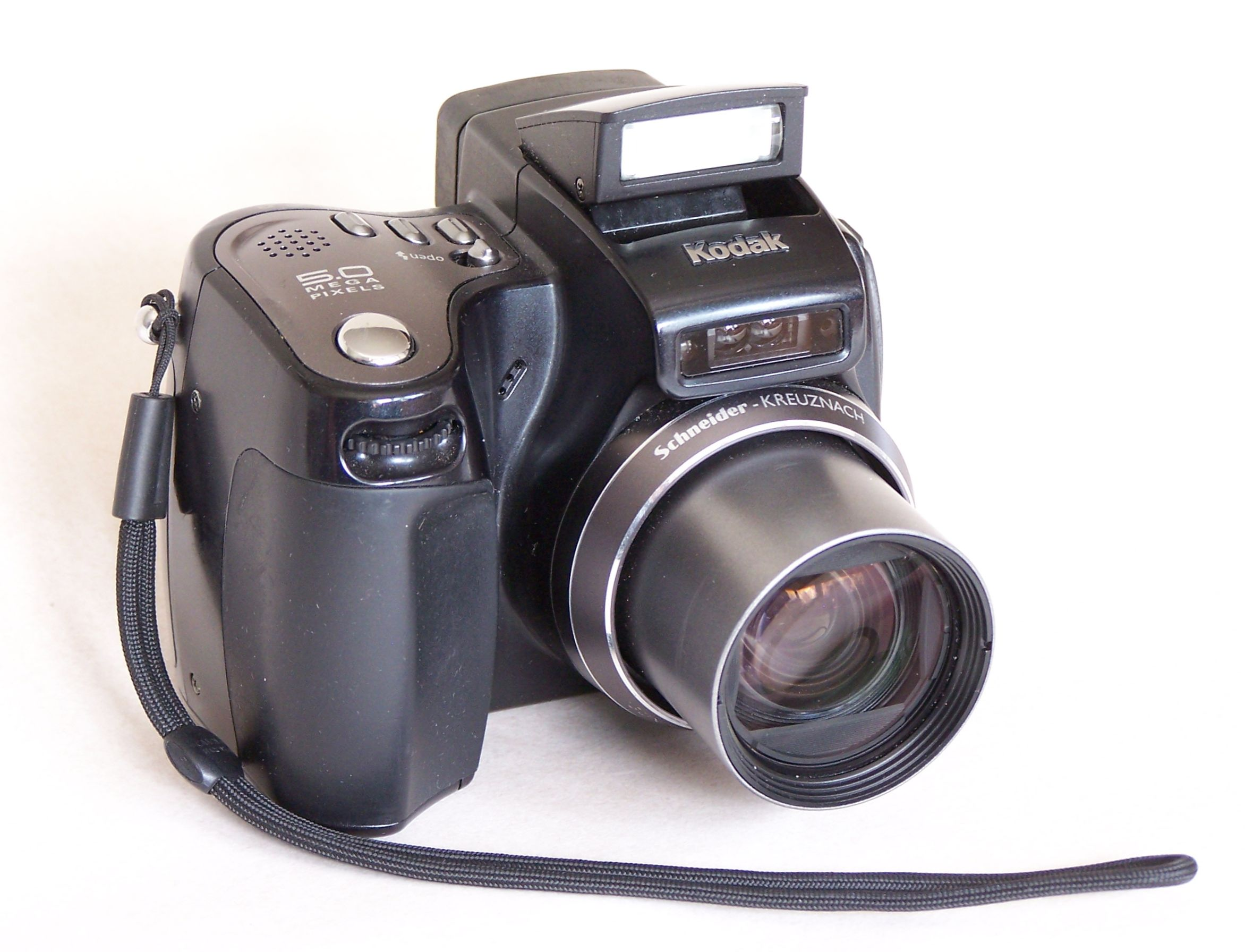

Overview
- Type: Point-and-shoot

Lens
- Lens: Schneider-Kreuznach 38—300mm equivalent 10× digital zoom F-stops: f/2.8 – f/3.7

Sensor/medium
- Sensor: 1 × 2.5 in (64 mm) CCD
- Maximum resolution: 2576 × 1932 = 4,976,832 pixels (4.8 megapixel)
- Film speed: 80 to 800 (at 1.8 megapixels); see (ISO equivalent)
- Storage media: SD card

Shutter
- Shutter speed range: 16 s to 1/1000 s

General
- LCD screen: 2.2 in (56 mm), 153,000 pixel TFT LCD
- Weight: 350 g (12.3 oz)

The Kodak DX7590 is a now-discontinued point and shoot model of digital camera first introduced in November 2004, replacing the earlier DX6490. It was manufactured by Eastman Kodak as part of the Kodak EasyShare product line's DX series.
