= Kodak EasyShare C330 =

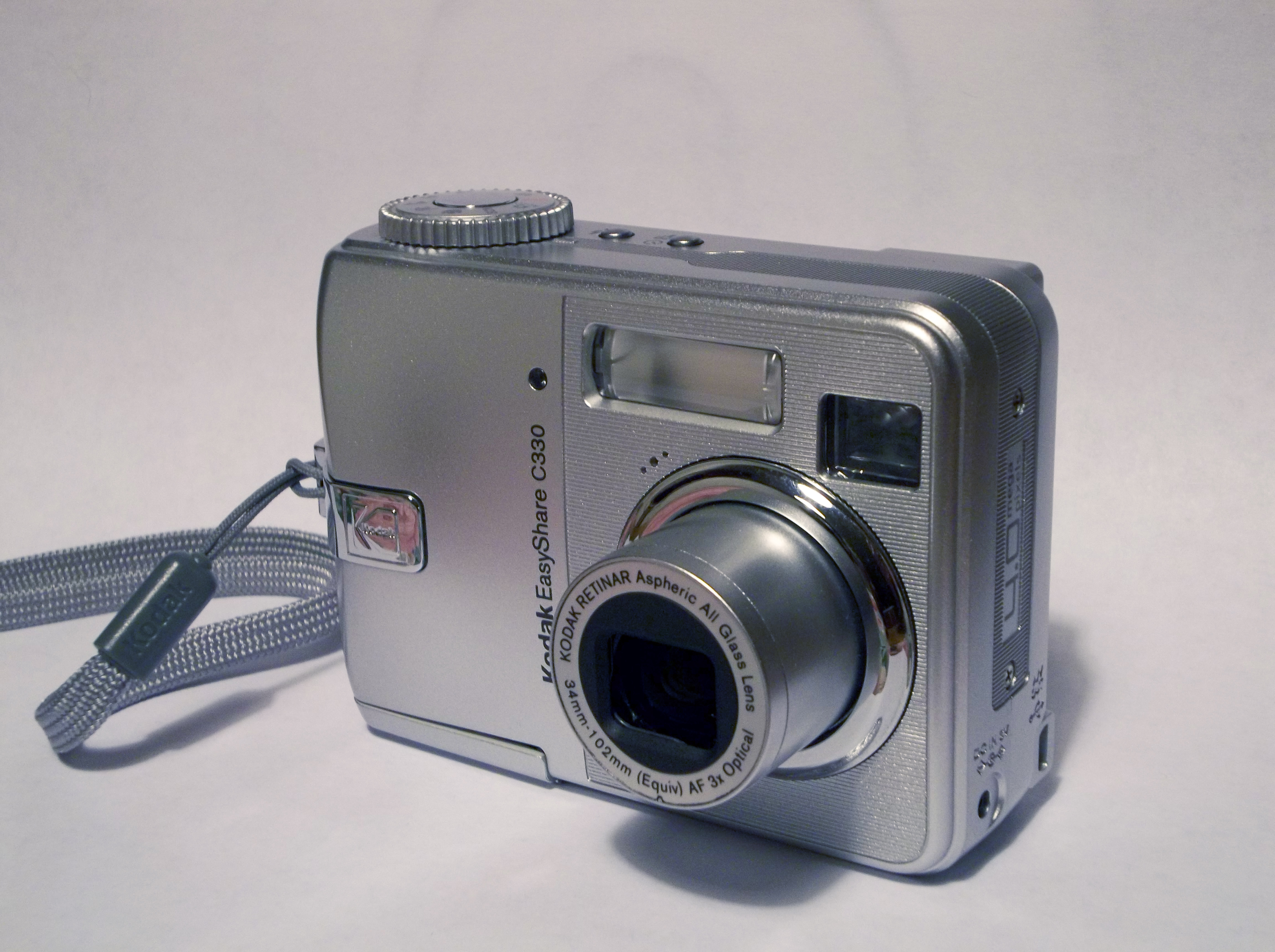
- Maker: Kodak

Sensor/medium
- Maximum resolution: 4.0 megapixels
- Storage media: SD

Focusing
- Focus modes: Auto Focus

General
- LCD screen: 1.6 inch
- Battery: 2 AA
- Weight: 145 g (5 oz) (body only)

The Kodak C330 is a model of digital camera produced by the Eastman Kodak Company. It was announced on May 4, 2005 and is part of the company's EasyShare consumer line of cameras.

== Input ==
The camera has a 3x optical zoom, and a 5x digital zoom beyond the optical zoom. The camera is able to record QVGA videos in 24 frames/s. It has auto, scene, portrait, sport, landscape, close-up, and video modes. Videos may be played on-camera, but with sound only. It has a viewfinder.

== Image storage ==
The camera has 16 MB of internal memory. Memory capacity can be expanded with 16MB, 32MB, 64MB, 128MB, 256MB, 512MB up to a maximum of 1 GB SD or MMC cards. It includes an AV/USB port for viewing photos on a RCA television with the included adapter or transferring images to a computer via USB.

== Review ==
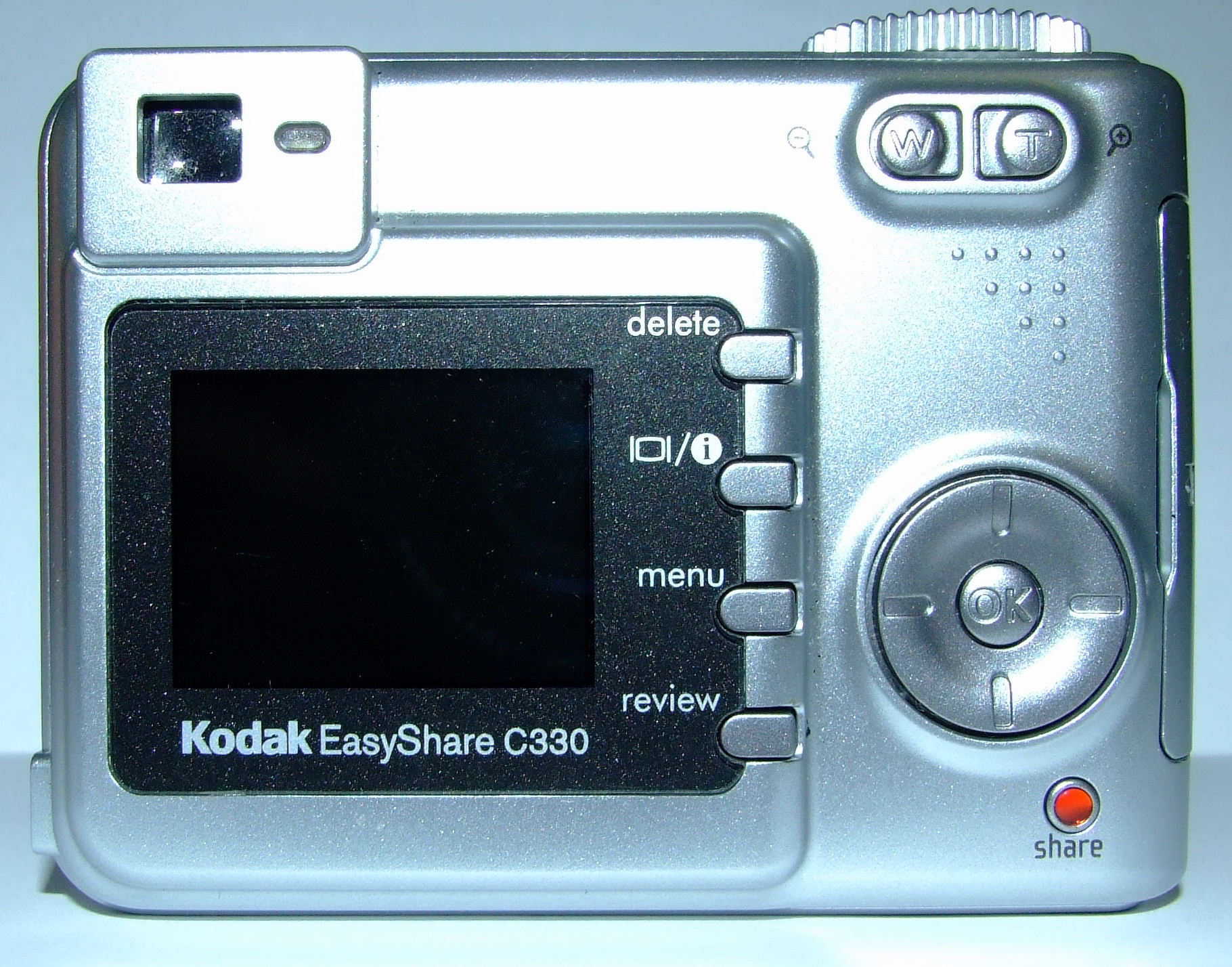
Rear display

The camera includes a 1.5-inch (38 mm) LCD screen.

== Output ==
The camera kit includes a USB cable for uploading images to a computer. It is compatible with the Kodak camera docks and PictBridge printer docks, and card readers.
