= Kodak EasyShare DX4530 =

Kodak DX4530
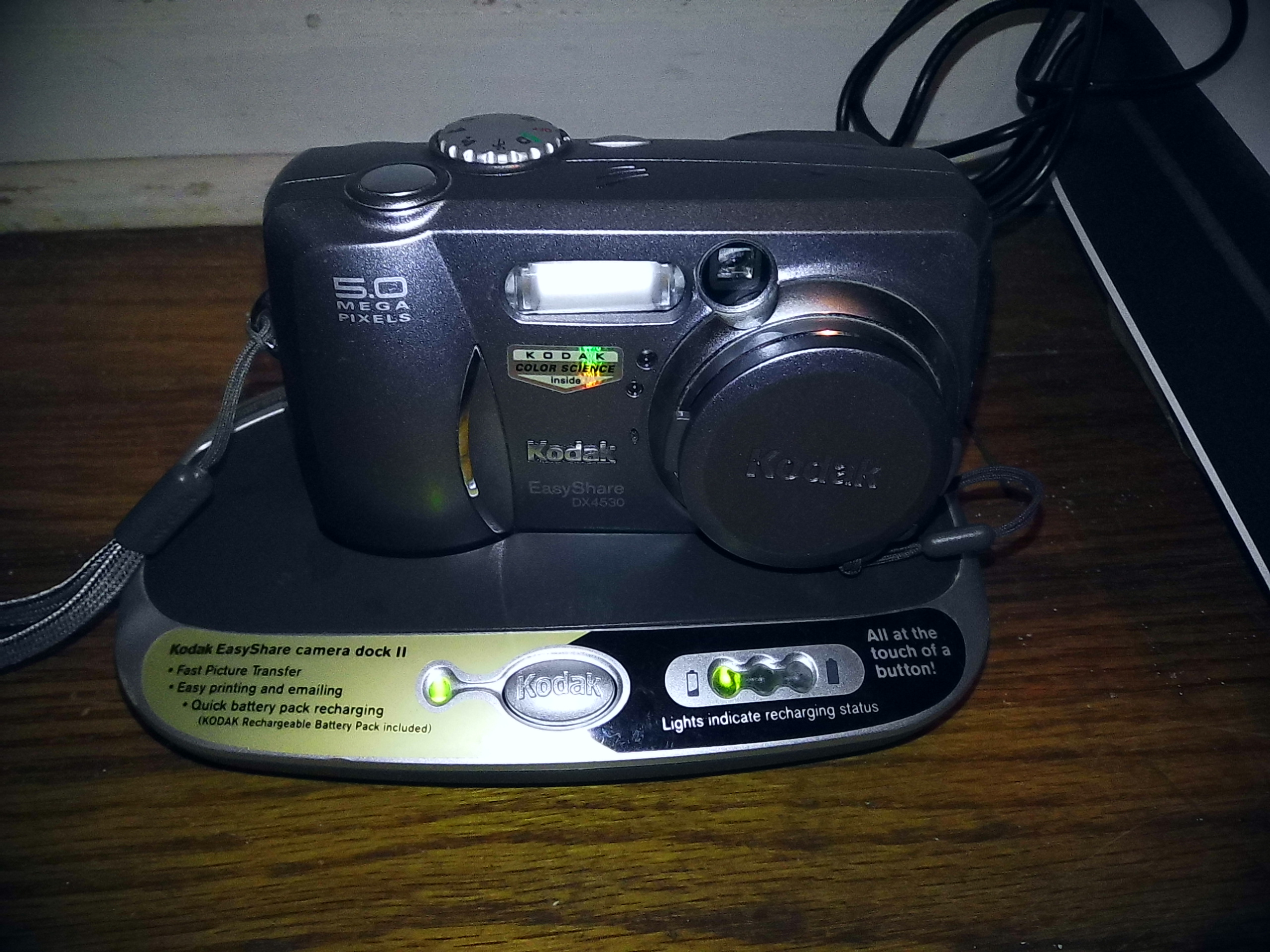

Overview
- Maker: Kodak
- Type: Compact digital camera

Lens
- Lens: 3× zoom

Sensor/medium
- Maximum resolution: 2580 × 1932
- Storage media: 32 MB internal, MMC card or SD card

Viewfinder
- Viewfinder: Optical & 1.8 in. 72k pixel LCD

The Kodak EasyShare DX4530 is a digital camera made by Kodak, announced on Aug 5, 2003. Part of the DX Series of Kodak's EasyShare brand, its features include a 3x optical zoom and 10x zoom overall (combined optical and digital zoom). The camera features a 5 megapixel CCD detector and supports six modes of operation: "sport" for use when the target is in motion, "night" for use in low light levels, "landscape" for use with distant scenery, "close up" for objects closer than 28 inches away, "auto" for general use, and "video" used to capture motion and sound.

The DX4530 interfaces with a computer using standard USB plugs, and can store photos on the integral internal memory, or added flash memory cards. It has a 1-inch rear screen for use in taking pictures as well as a standard camera viewfinder. Other features include subject tracking, orientation tracker, long time exposure, exposure compensation, a self-timer, and three quality levels for pictures it takes.
