= Kodak EasyShare C613 =

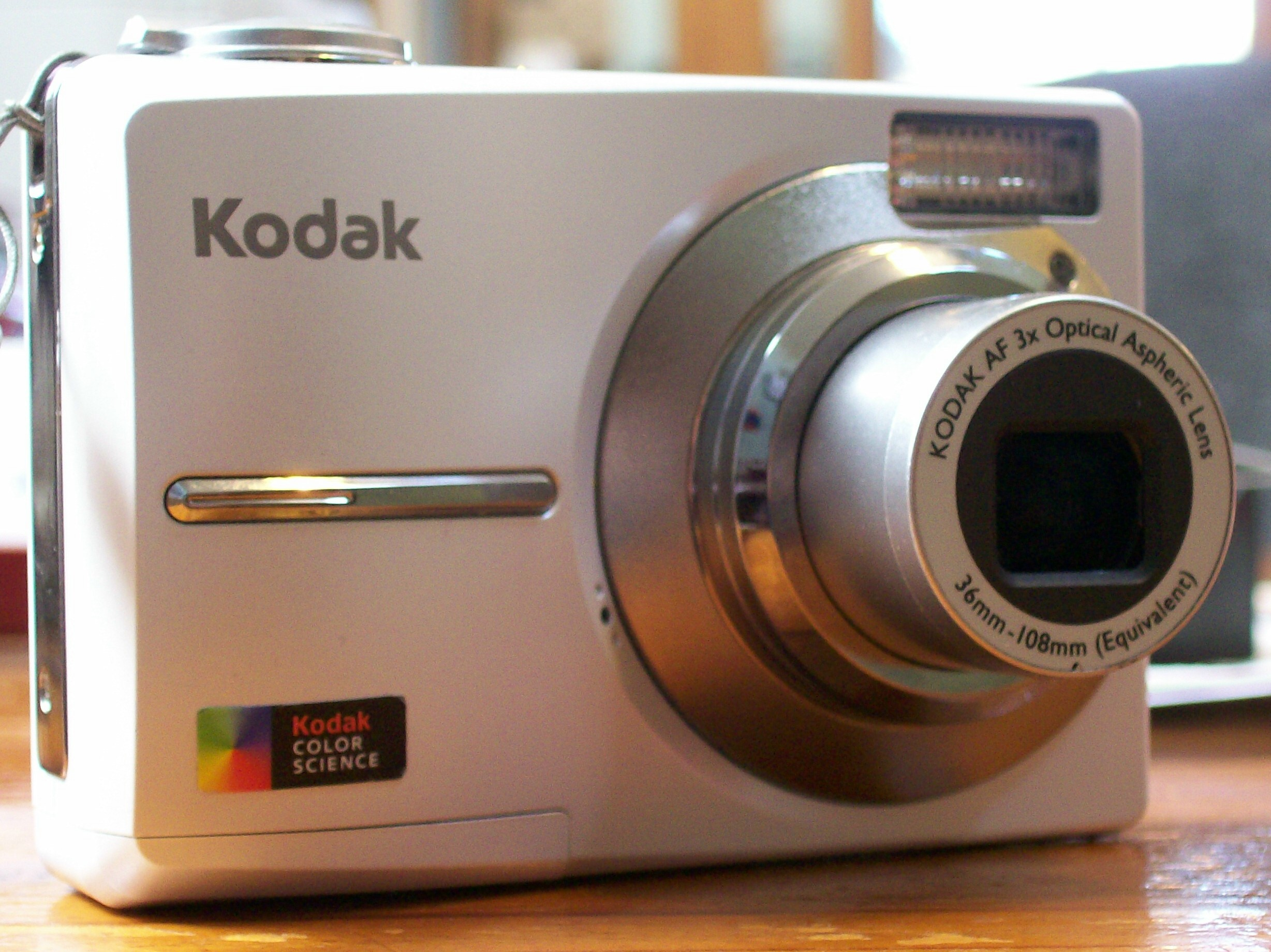

Sensor/medium
- Maximum resolution: 6 megapixels
- Storage media: SD / MMC

Focusing
- Focus modes: Auto focus

General
- LCD screen: 2.4 inch
- Battery: 2 x AA

Of the four new Kodak models announced at PMA 2007, the entry point looks to be the Kodak EasyShare C613, a six megapixel camera with Kodak-branded 3x optical zoom lens, 2.4" LCD, and 10MB of built-in memory. Other features of the Kodak C613 include USB connectivity, an [SD / MMC card slot], and power from two AA batteries (with alkaline disposables in the product bundle).

EasyShare C613 shooting modes include digital IS, auto, SCN, video, close-up and favorites. Available scene modes include portrait, night portrait, landscape, night landscape, closeup, sports, snow, beach, text/document, backlight, museum/manner, fireworks, high ISO, children, flower, self-portrait, sunset and candlelight. The C613's top ISO sensitivity is rated at 1,250.

C613 movies are recorded in QuickTime MPEG4 format with audio, available in VGA (640 x 480) at 15 frame/s and QVGA (320 x 240) at 30 frame/s quality settings, with lengths up to 80 minutes based on memory capacity.
