= Kodak EasyShare C340 =

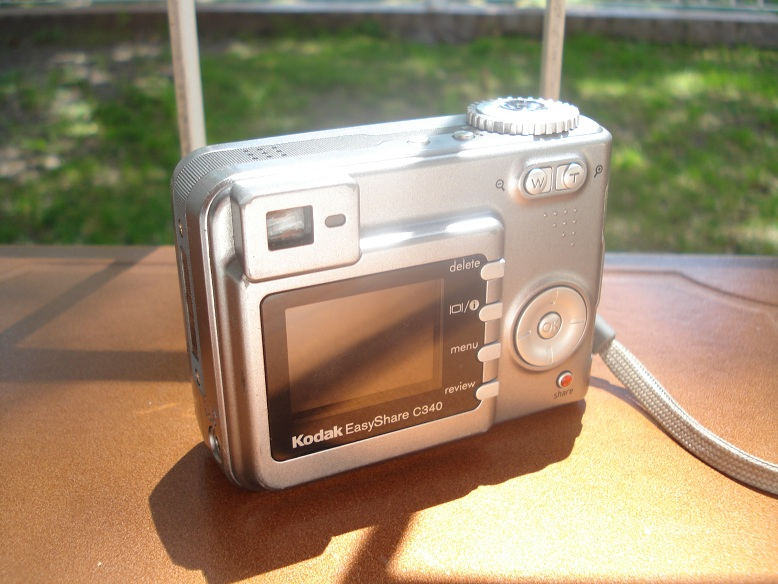
- Maker: Kodak

Sensor/medium
- Maximum resolution: 5.0 megapixels
- Storage media: SD and internal memory

Focusing
- Focus modes: Auto focus

General
- LCD screen: 1.6 inch
- Battery: 2× AA batteries
- Weight: 145 g (5 oz) (body only)

The Kodak C340 is a model of digital camera produced by the Eastman Kodak Company. It is part of the company's EasyShare consumer line of cameras, and is compatible with the Kodak camera docks and printer docks.
