= Kodak EasyShare DX6440 =

Kodak DX6440
Overview
- Type: Compact digital camera

Lens
- Lens: 33 mm to 132 mm (135 format equivalent) (4× zoom)

Sensor/medium
- Sensor: 1/2.5" CCD
- Maximum resolution: 2304 × 1728
- Storage media: MM card, SD card

Viewfinder
- Viewfinder: Optical & 1.8 in LCD

The Kodak DX6440 is a model of digital camera produced by the Eastman Kodak Company. It is part of the company's EasyShare consumer line of cameras, and is compatible with the Kodak camera docks and printer docks. Its 1/2.5" CCD image sensor gives a 4 megapixel image, while the fully retractable Schneider-Kreuznach lens has a focal length range equivalent to 33mm–132mm on a 135 film camera, which is a 4× range.
