= Kodak EasyShare DX6490 =

Kodak DX6490
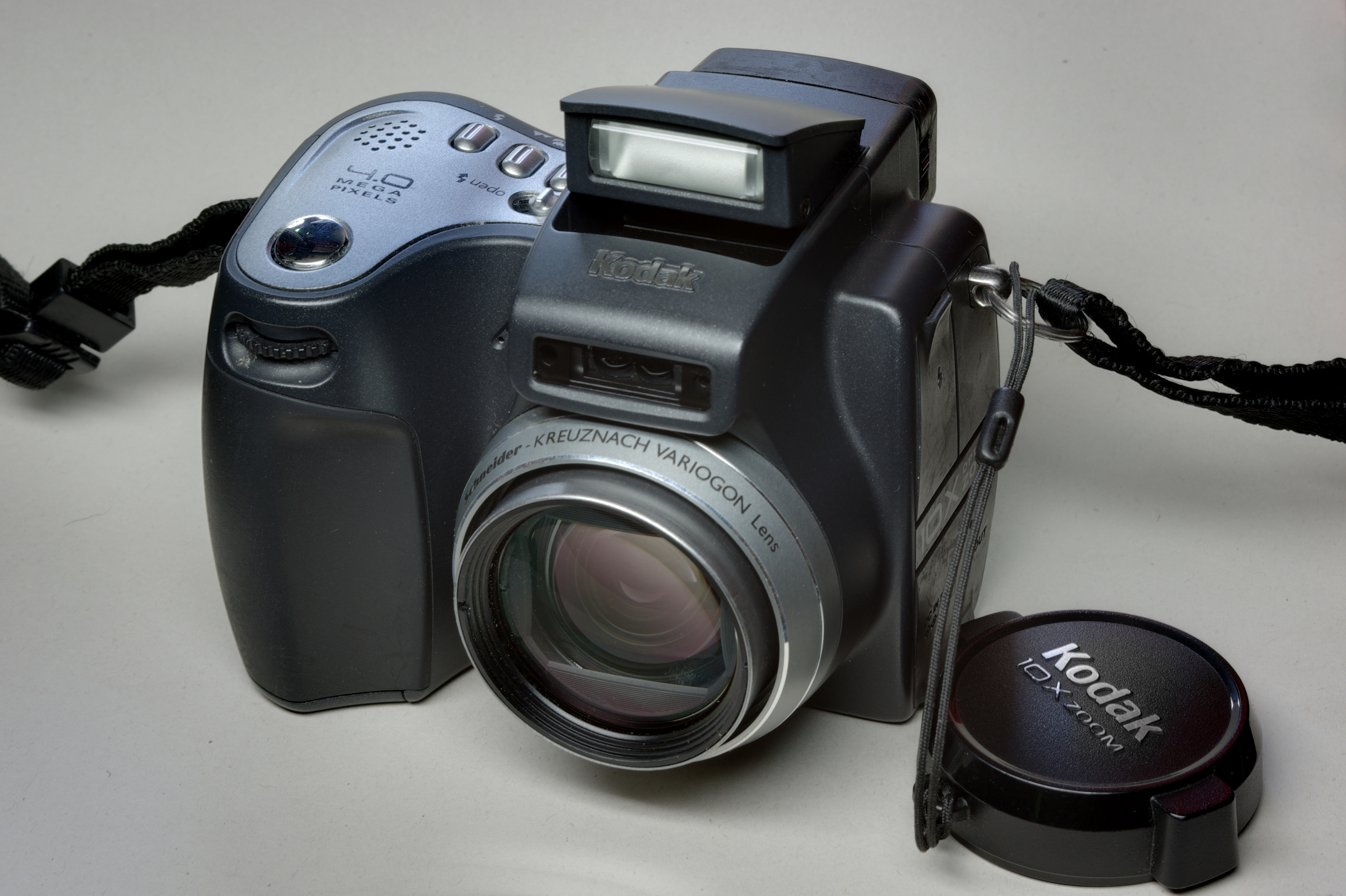

Lens
- Lens: 38 - 380 mm (35 mm equivalent)

Sensor/medium
- Sensor: 4.23 megapixels (2,408 x 1,758 pixels)
- Maximum resolution: 4.0 megapixels (2,304 x 1,728 pixels)
- Film speed: Automatic: 80 - 160, Selectable: 80/100/200/400/800
- Storage media: 16 MB internal, MMC or SD

Focusing
- Focus areas: Multi-zone, center-spot

Exposure/metering
- Exposure modes: Program Auto [P], Shutter Priority Auto [S], Aperture Priority Auto [A], Manual [M]

Flash
- Flash: Built-in
- Flash bracketing: Wide: 0.5 - 4.9 m (1.6 - 16.1 ft.), tele: 2.0 - 3.7 m (6.6 - 12.1 ft.)

Shutter
- Shutter speed range: 16 to 1/1700 second
- Continuous shooting: 3 frames per second up to 6 pictures

Viewfinder
- Viewfinder: Electronic .44 in., 180K pixels (800 x 225)

General
- LCD screen: 2.2 inch (56 mm), 153,000 pixels
- Battery: Lithium ion
- Weight: 337 g (11.9 oz) without battery

The Kodak EasyShare DX 6490 is a digital camera made by Kodak in 2004. No longer manufactured, the camera was part of the DX Series of Kodak's EasyShare brand.
