= Kodak EasyShare =

Brand of cameras, printers and other products

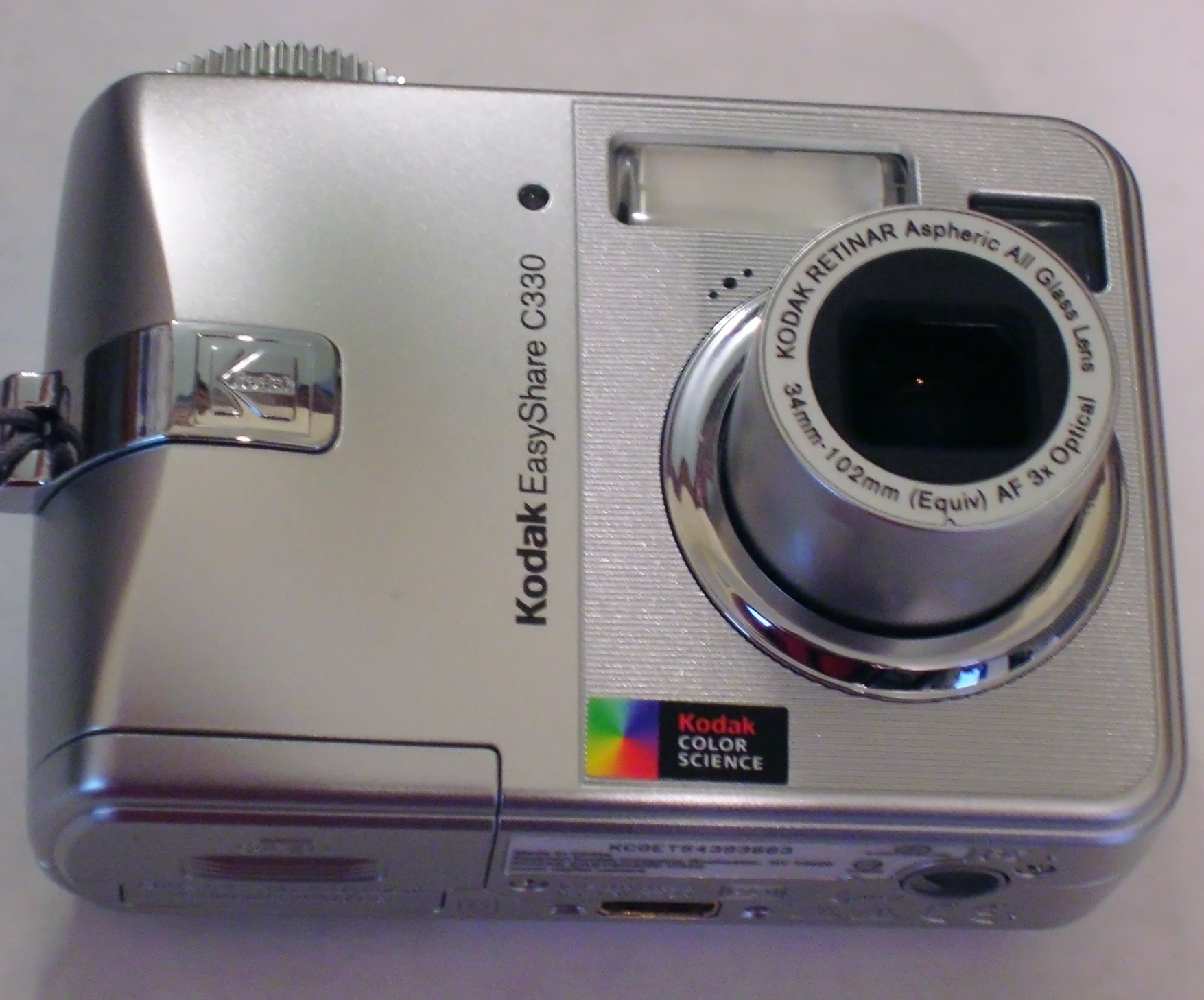
Kodak EasyShare C330

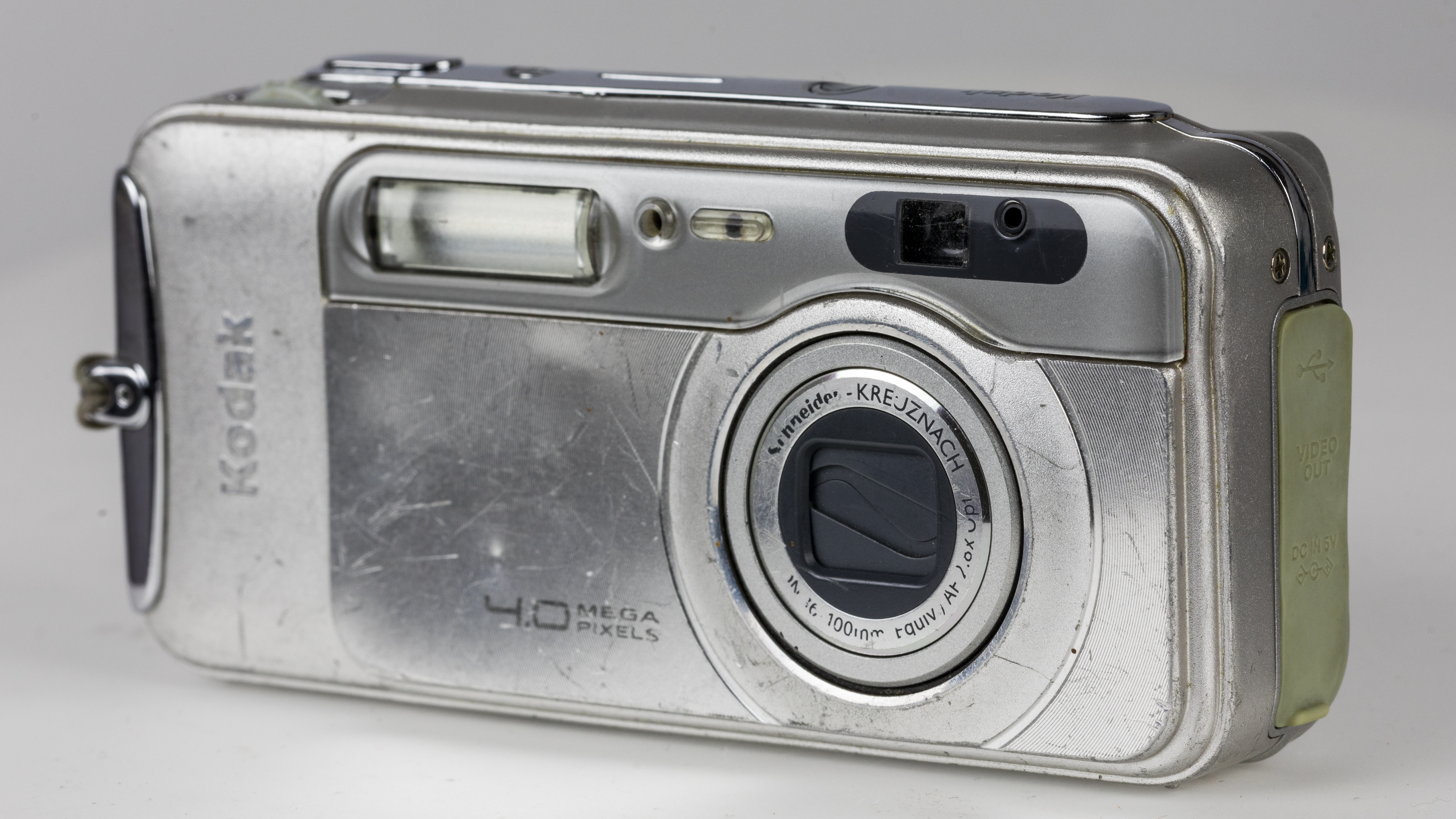
Kodak EasyShare LS743

Kodak EasyShare was a sub-brand of Eastman Kodak Company products identifying a consumer photography system of digital cameras, snapshot thermal printers, snapshot thermal printer docks, all-in-one inkjet printers, accessories, camera docks, software, and online print services. The brand was introduced in 2001, and discontinued in 2012, when Kodak stopped manufacturing and selling all digital cameras and photo frames.

Today, Kodak-branded digital cameras still exist, but they’re made by third-party companies (JK Imaging) under license—not by Kodak itself.

== EasyShare Digital Cameras ==
The original products to use the EasyShare brand were the DX3600 and DX3500 digital camera along with the EasyShare Camera Dock.

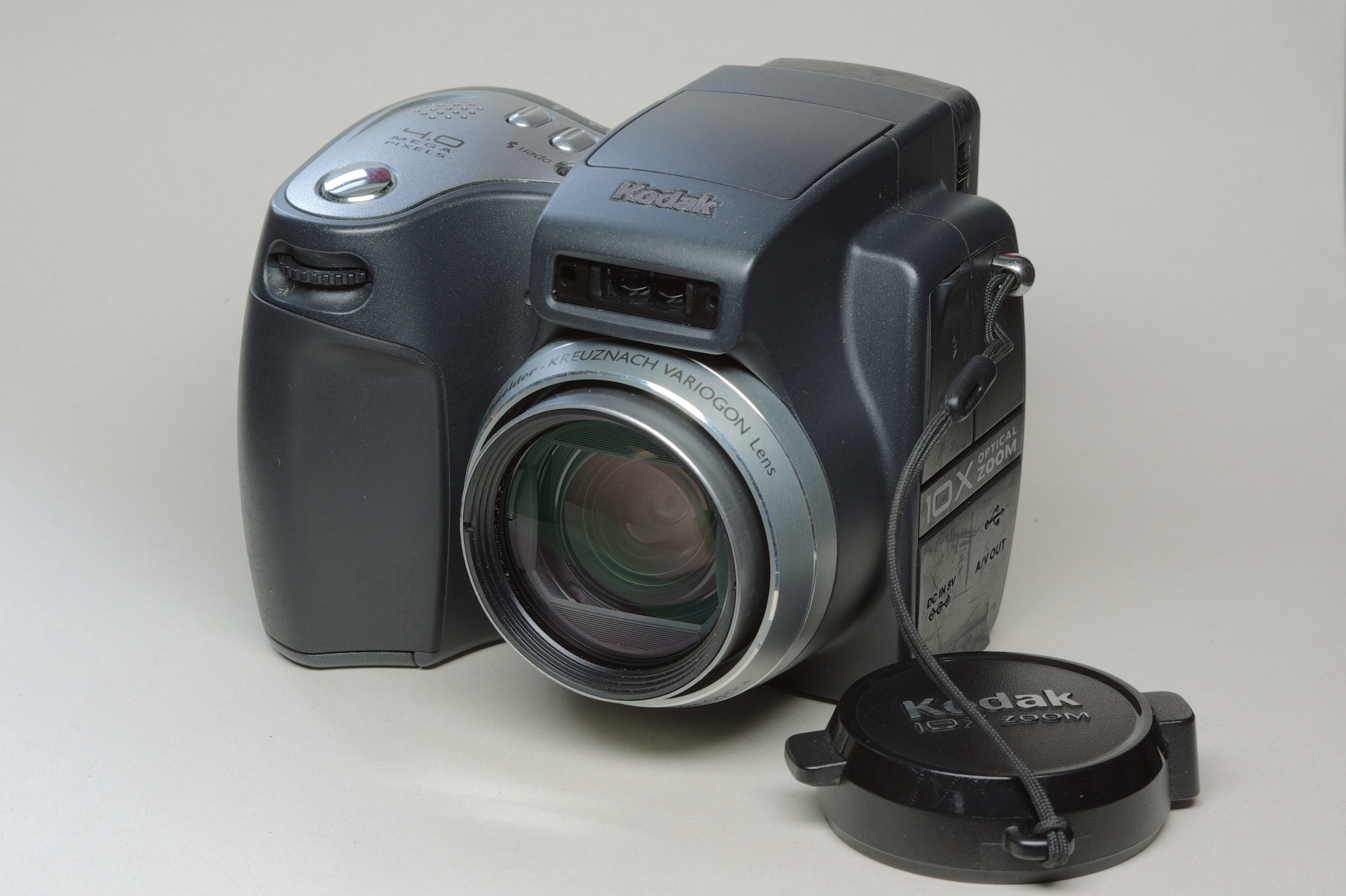
Kodak EasyShare DX6490 (2003)

=== Kodak EasyShare DX-Series ===
The DX series cameras were the first EasyShare models released. It was originally a very basic point and shoot camera series, compatible with the original EasyShare Camera Dock. The CX series eventually replaced the lower-end DX models, and the newer DX-Series models had more advanced features and higher resolution and zoom features. The higher-end DX Series models eventually became the Z-Series. Models in the DX series were the last Kodak consumer digital cameras to use CompactFlash memory cards.

Models included:

- DX3215 (1.3 MP, 30-60 mm zoom lens with 2X zoom)
- DX3500 (2.2 MP, 38 mm zoom lens with 3X zoom)
- DX3600 (2.2 MP, 35-70mm zoom lens)
- DX3900 (3.3 MP, 35–70 mm zoom lens)
- DX4330 (3.1 MP, 38–114 mm zoom lens)
- DX4530(5.2 MP, 38-114mm zoom lens)
- DX4900 (4.1 MP, 35-70mm zoom lens)
- DX6440 (4.23 MP, 33–132 mm zoom lens)
- DX6490 (4.23 MP, 38–380 mm zoom lens)
- DX7440 (4.0 MP, 33–132 mm zoom lens)
- DX7590 (5.0 MP, 38–380 mm zoom lens)
- DX7630 (6.2 MP, 39–117 mm zoom lens).

=== Kodak EasyShare CX-Series ===
The CX series grew out of the DX series. At the time, it was the range of the lowest-priced, most basic point and shoot cameras, typically with no more than 3× optical zoom. The CX series was replaced by the C series.

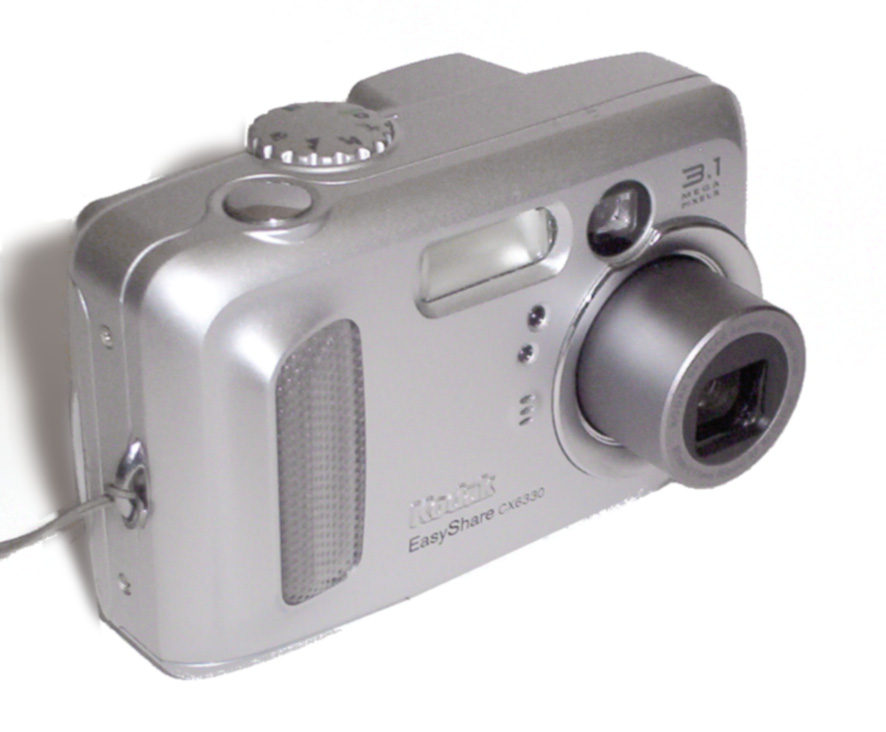
Kodak EasyShare CX6330

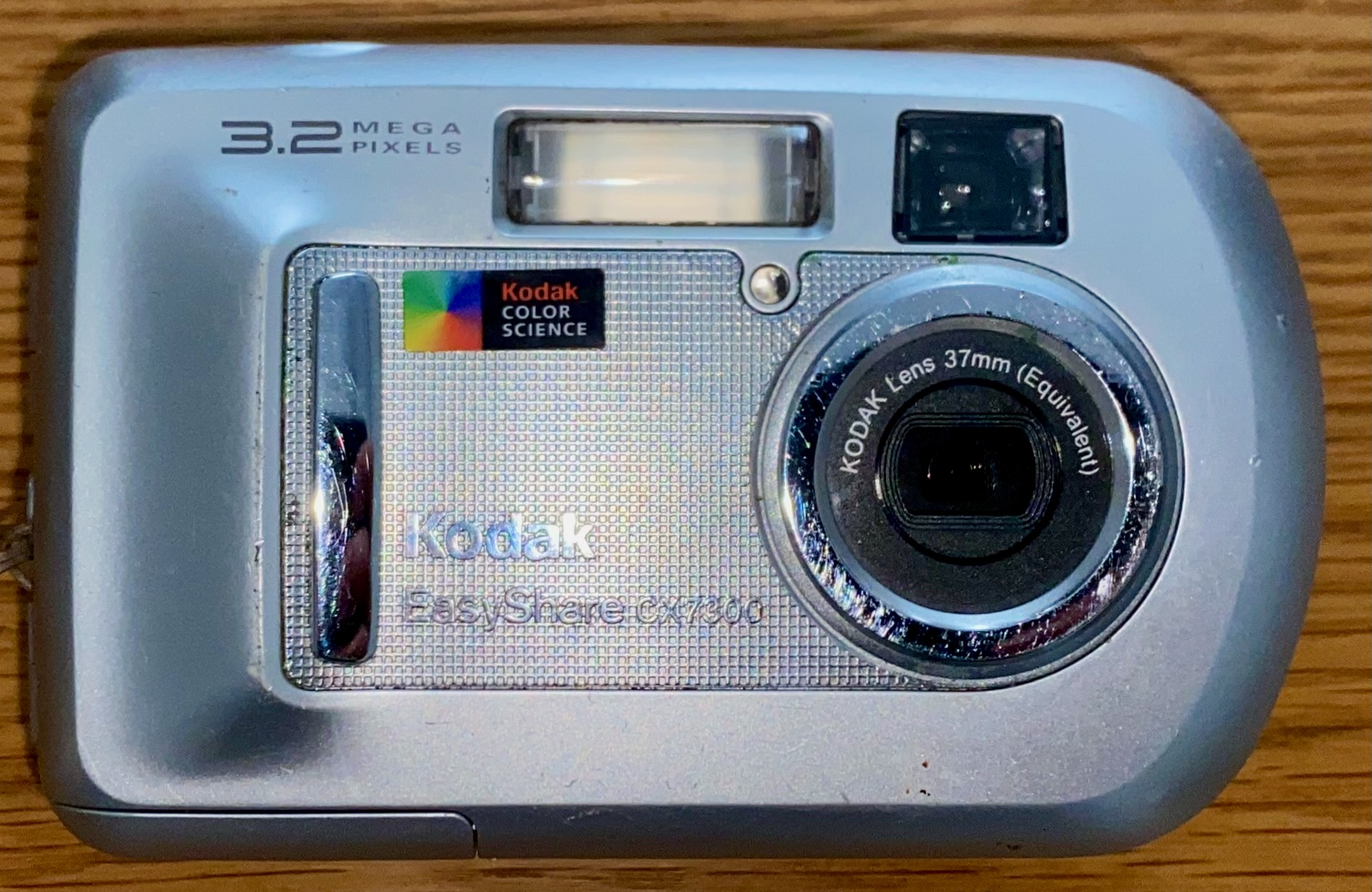
Kodak EasyShare CX7300

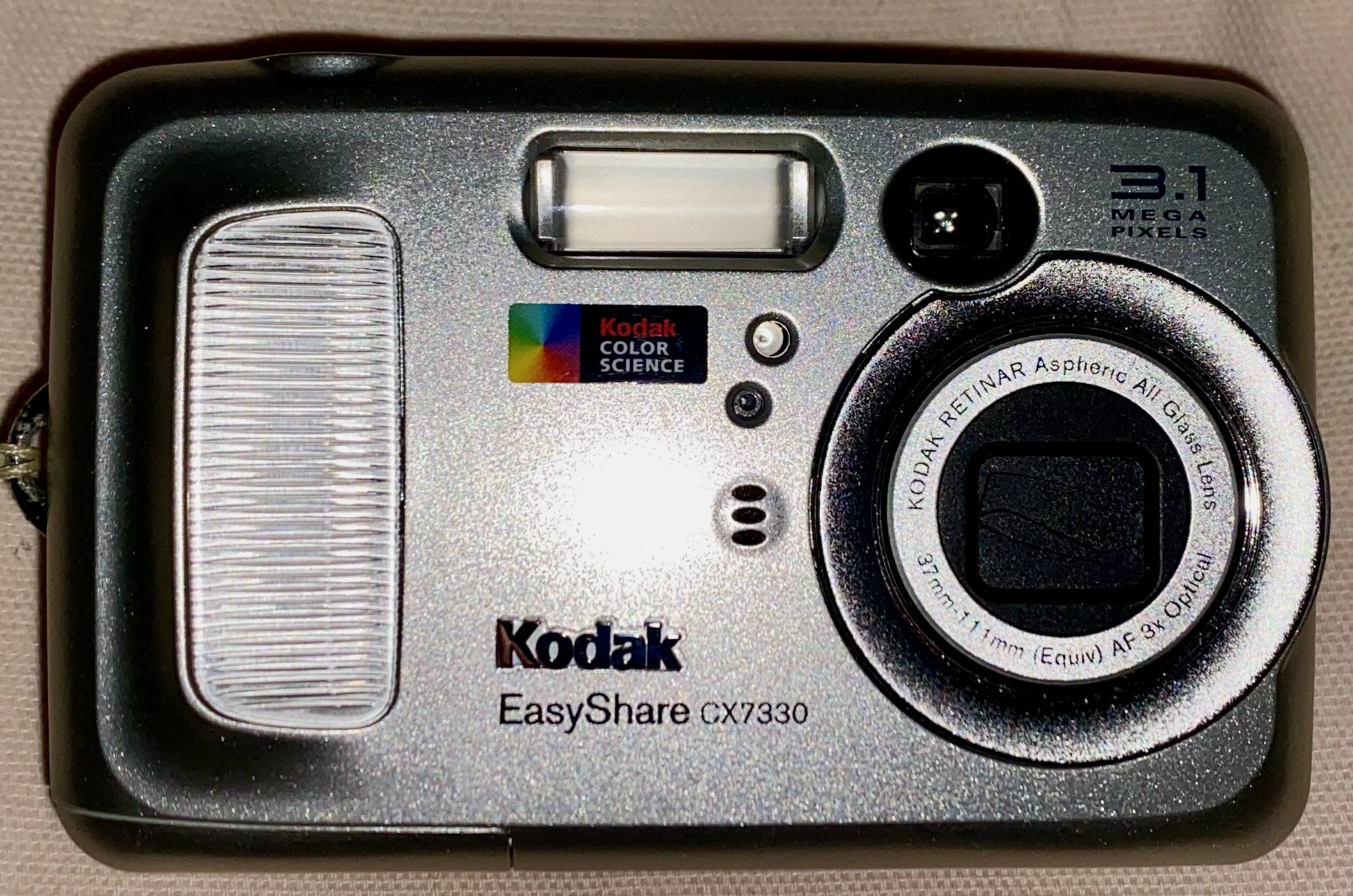
Kodak EasyShare CX7330

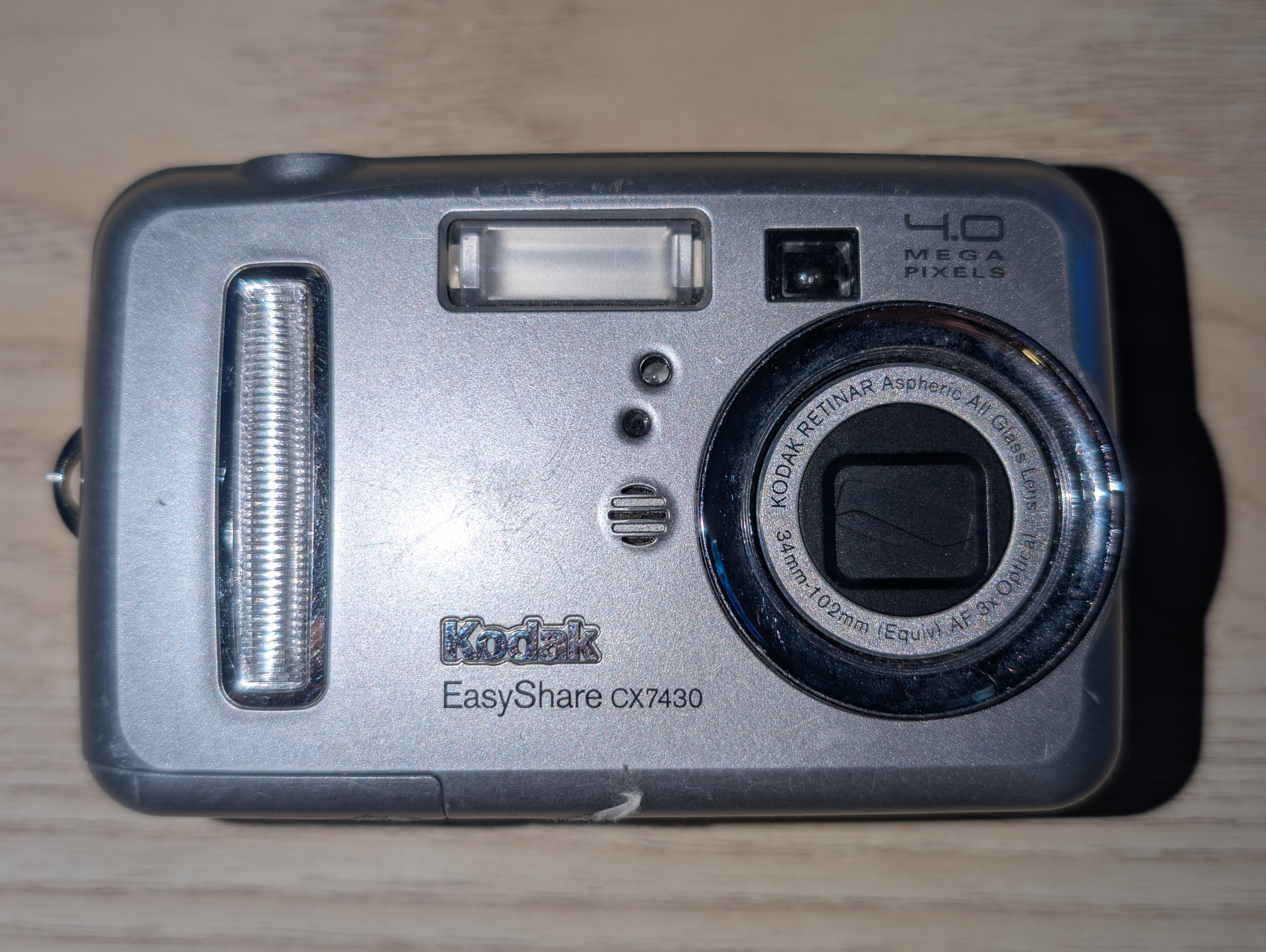
Kodak EasyShare CX7430

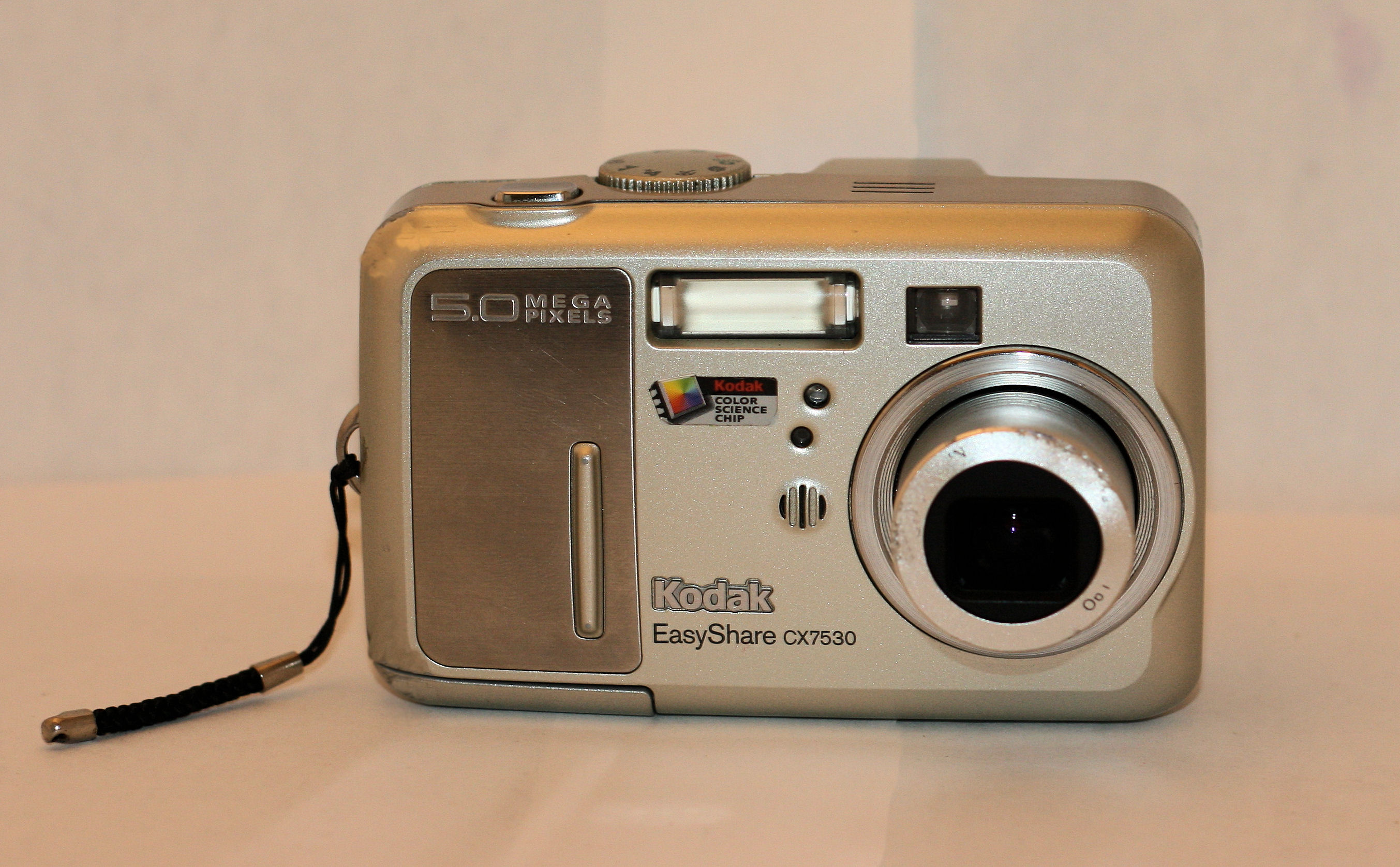
Kodak EasyShare CX7530

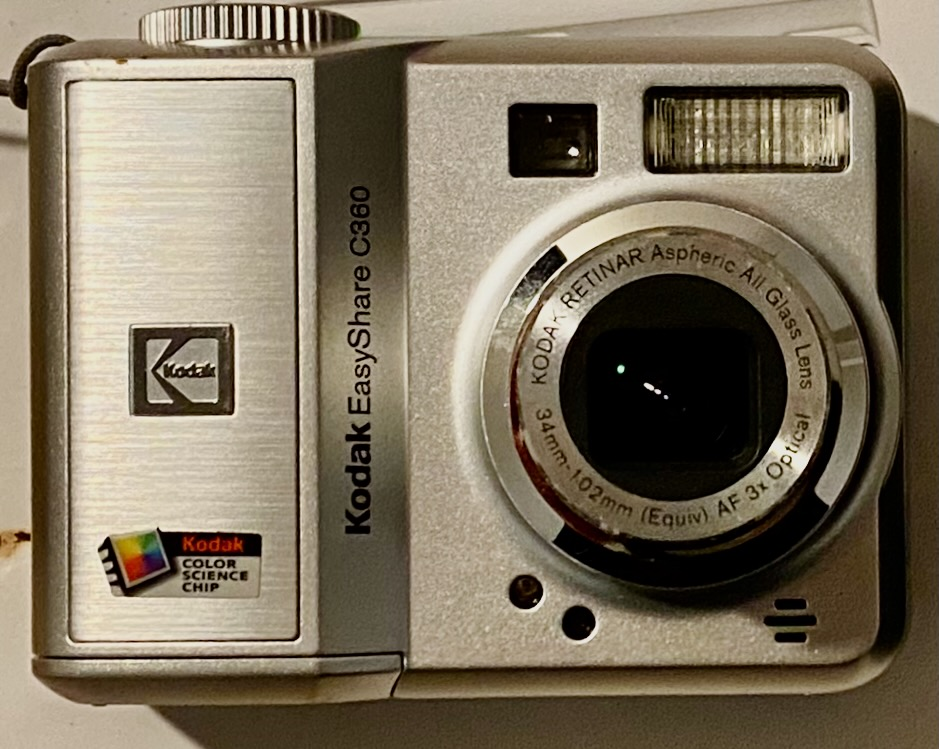
EasyShare C360

=== Kodak EasyShare C-Series ===
The C-series was Kodak's line of lower-priced, point and shoot, entry-level digital cameras.

=== Kodak EasyShare Z-Series ===
The Z-series was Kodak's high-zoom and performance-oriented range of consumer digital cameras, replacing the original DX series. Typically, Z-Series cameras have higher optical zooms than any other series. The highest optical zoom camera offered by Kodak was the Z990 with a 30X optical zoom.

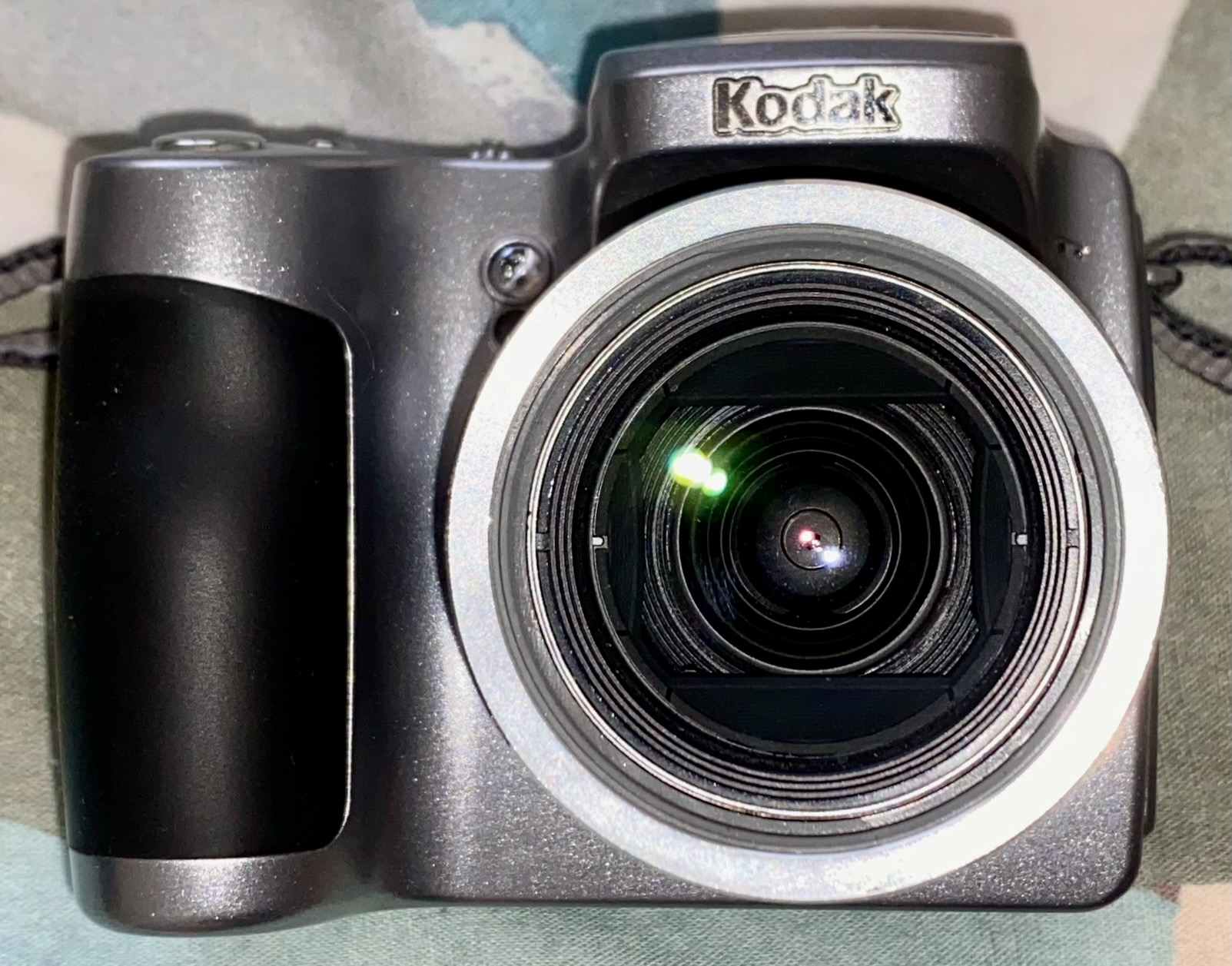
EasyShare Z740 front

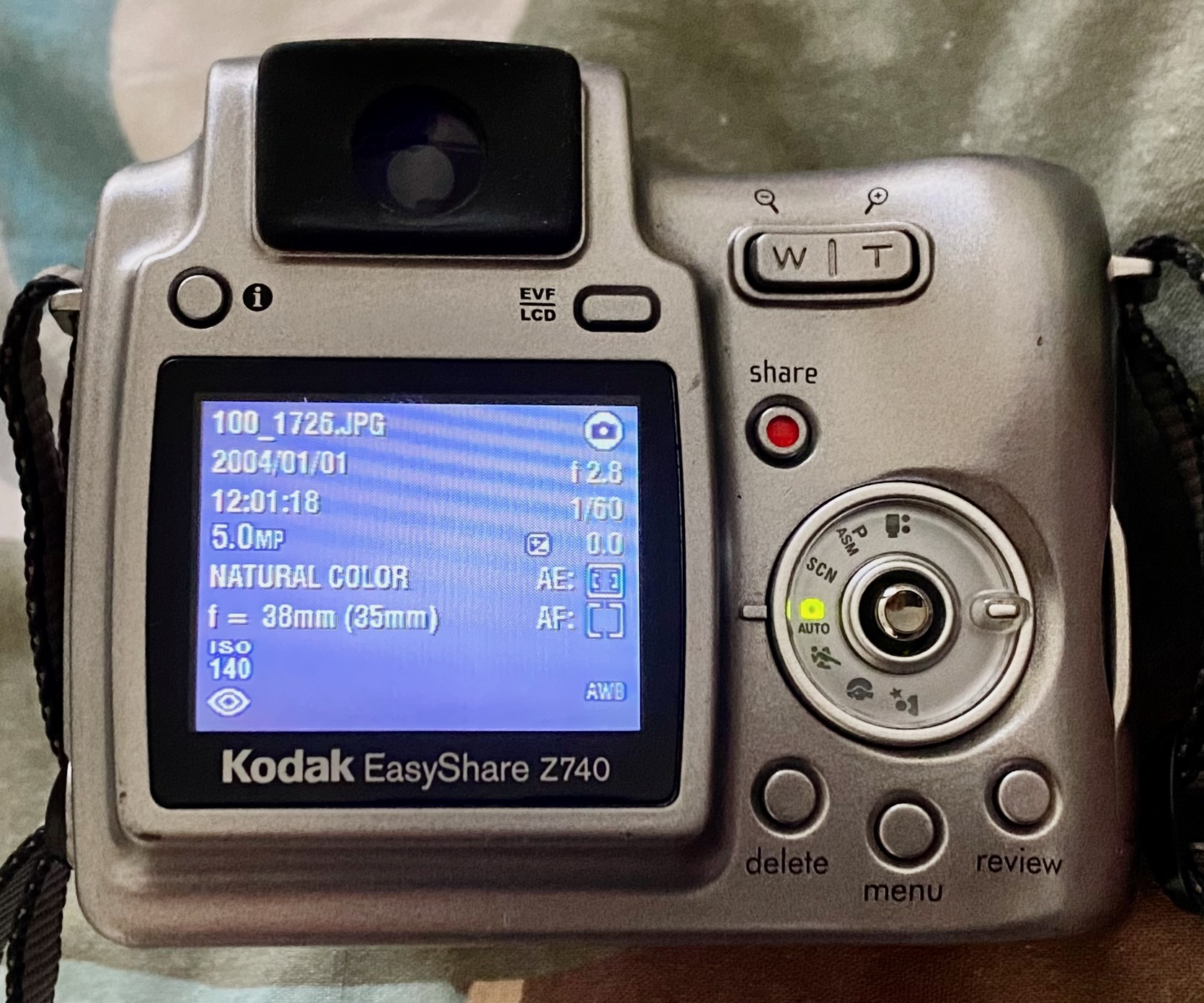
EasyShare Z740 back

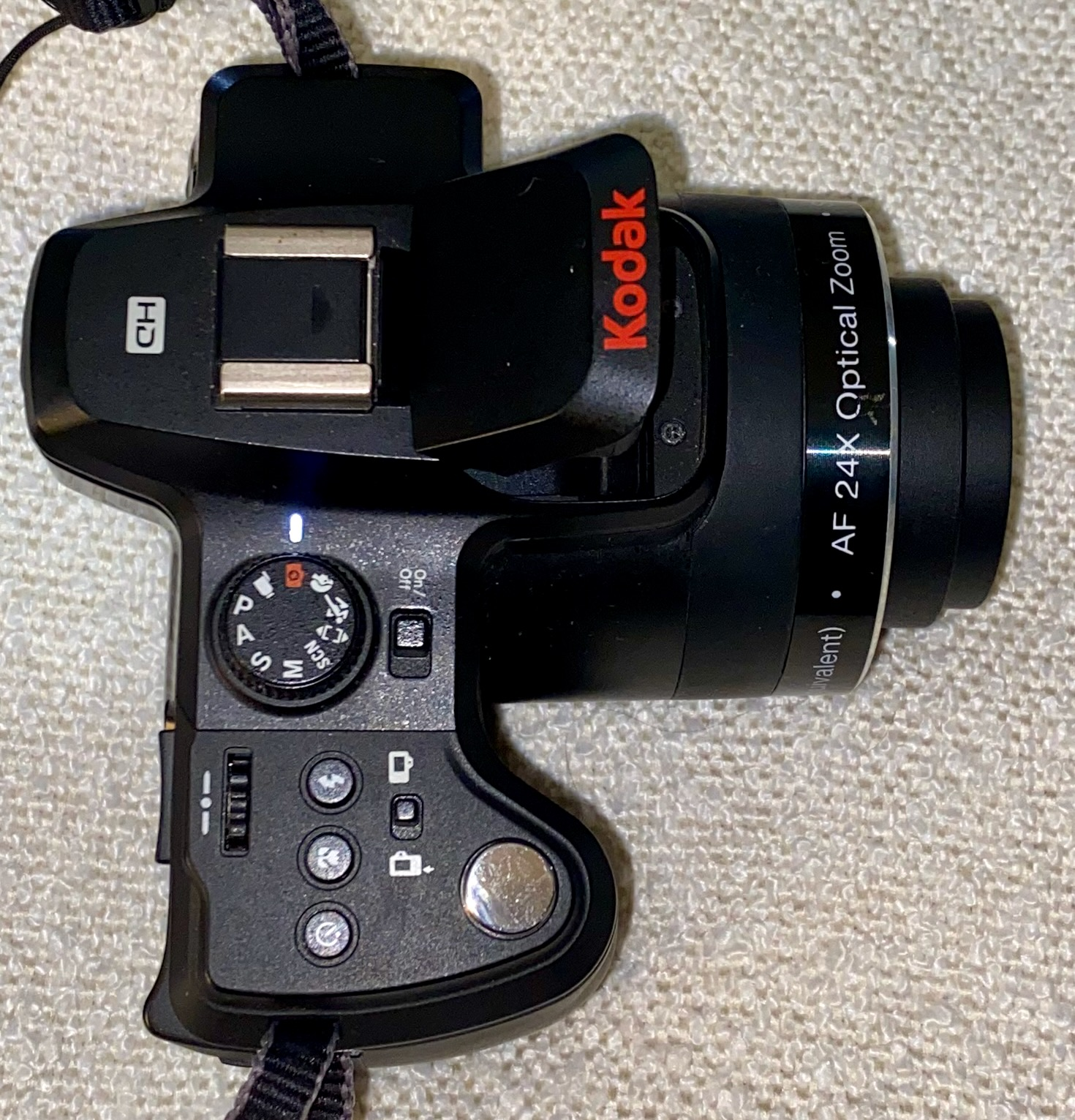
EasyShare Z980

=== Kodak EasyShare V-Series ===
The V-Series was another style-oriented range of consumer digital cameras, replacing the original LS series. V-Series had a number of innovations, such as dual-lens technology, first introduced with the V570. The V-Series line was superseded by higher-end M-Series cameras.

=== Kodak EasyShare P-Series ===
The P-Series was Kodak's "Performance" series intended to bring DSLR-like features to a consumer model. The series was superseded by higher-end Z-Series models. These were the only consumer models to leverage an external flash, with the exception of the Z980.

=== Kodak EasyShare-One Series ===
The EasyShare-One series used an SDIO card to automatically upload pictures over Wi-Fi.

=== Kodak EasyShare M-Series ===
The EasyShare were originally a blend between thinner point-and-shoot cameras (C series) and stylish cameras (V series), later positioned as "Sleek and Stylish" with the discontinuance of the V-Series. They were usually available in a variety of colors and generally have features not available in the C-Series line.

To promote the M-Series, which featured the share button for social network media sharing, Kodak announced their "So Kodak" marketing campaign, which featured artists Drake, Pitbull, and Trey Songz.

== EasyShare Digital Frames ==
=== Kodak EasyShare SV-Series ===
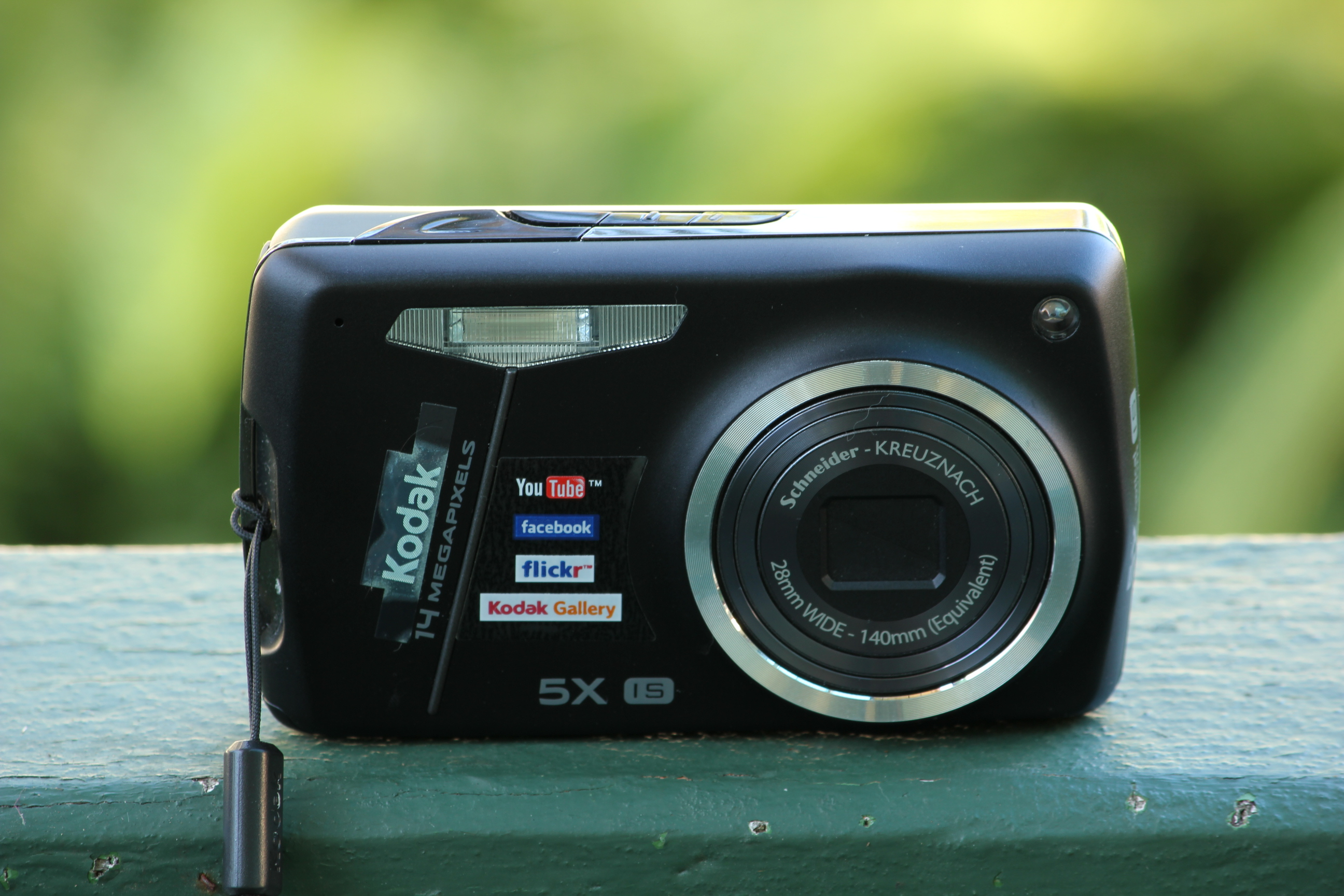
Kodak EasyShare M575

The original line of digital frames that played pictures and videos (replaced by M-Series).

=== Kodak EasyShare EX-Series ===
The original line of digital frames that included the features of SV-Series frames but included Wi-Fi (replaced by W-Series).

=== Kodak EasyShare M-Series ===
The M-series line of "multimedia" digital frames play pictures and videos.

=== Kodak EasyShare W-Series ===
The W-series line of "wireless" digital frames which could be connected via Wi-Fi to a home computer or the internet.

=== Kodak EasyShare D-Series ===
The D-series line of "decor" digital frames allow mounting with standard 8x10 frame.

=== Kodak EasyShare S-Series ===
The S-series currently designates digital frames that are "cordless" in that they have a rechargeable battery allowing viewing without a power cable for several hours. There was a much older frame, the S510, that was not cordless and predated the P-Series.

=== Kodak EasyShare P-Series ===
The P-series line of digital frames stands for "Photo"; these frames can only be used for pictures and not multimedia.

== Other products ==
The EasyShare brand also was incorporated with the original 5000-series all-in-one inkjet printers (superseded by the ESP line), thermal photo printers and printer docks (discontinued since 2012), and camera docks.

== EasyShare Software ==
=== EasyShare Software ===
Kodak EasyShare software was used to transfer and catalog images from EasyShare cameras and could also be used with existing images (in .gif, .png, .jpg, or .tiff format) and non-Kodak digital cameras. The final version of Kodak EasyShare software was version 8.3, which included support for Windows 7. This software included the ability to upload pictures and videos to Facebook, YouTube and Kodak Gallery. Other features included the ability to rate, tag, and caption pictures, online print ordering, and photo enhancement and alteration. Kodak removed this software from its download pages in 2012.

The updater component of the software was powered by BackWeb, which—though often associated with spyware—is said to be benign in this case..

=== EasyShare Custom Creations ===
This software, powered by RocketLife, is discontinued. It was a desktop application that allowed the user to create a personalized gift (ex. Photo Book) and burn the applicable files to a CD. Ordering and fulfillment was handled by dropping the CD off at a retailer.
